

342001–342100 

|-bgcolor=#fefefe
| 342001 ||  || — || September 2, 2008 || Kitt Peak || Spacewatch || — || align=right | 1.1 km || 
|-id=002 bgcolor=#fefefe
| 342002 ||  || — || September 2, 2008 || Kitt Peak || Spacewatch || NYS || align=right data-sort-value="0.65" | 650 m || 
|-id=003 bgcolor=#fefefe
| 342003 ||  || — || September 2, 2008 || Kitt Peak || Spacewatch || — || align=right | 1.1 km || 
|-id=004 bgcolor=#fefefe
| 342004 ||  || — || September 2, 2008 || Kitt Peak || Spacewatch || — || align=right data-sort-value="0.78" | 780 m || 
|-id=005 bgcolor=#E9E9E9
| 342005 ||  || — || September 2, 2008 || Kitt Peak || Spacewatch || — || align=right | 1.4 km || 
|-id=006 bgcolor=#fefefe
| 342006 ||  || — || September 2, 2008 || Kitt Peak || Spacewatch || V || align=right data-sort-value="0.82" | 820 m || 
|-id=007 bgcolor=#E9E9E9
| 342007 ||  || — || September 2, 2008 || Kitt Peak || Spacewatch || — || align=right data-sort-value="0.94" | 940 m || 
|-id=008 bgcolor=#E9E9E9
| 342008 ||  || — || September 2, 2008 || Kitt Peak || Spacewatch || — || align=right | 1.1 km || 
|-id=009 bgcolor=#fefefe
| 342009 ||  || — || September 2, 2008 || La Sagra || OAM Obs. || — || align=right data-sort-value="0.95" | 950 m || 
|-id=010 bgcolor=#E9E9E9
| 342010 ||  || — || September 3, 2008 || Kitt Peak || Spacewatch || — || align=right | 1.4 km || 
|-id=011 bgcolor=#E9E9E9
| 342011 ||  || — || September 4, 2008 || Kitt Peak || Spacewatch || MAR || align=right | 1.2 km || 
|-id=012 bgcolor=#fefefe
| 342012 ||  || — || September 4, 2008 || Kitt Peak || Spacewatch || — || align=right | 1.0 km || 
|-id=013 bgcolor=#fefefe
| 342013 ||  || — || September 5, 2008 || Kitt Peak || Spacewatch || — || align=right data-sort-value="0.96" | 960 m || 
|-id=014 bgcolor=#fefefe
| 342014 ||  || — || September 6, 2008 || Mount Lemmon || Mount Lemmon Survey || V || align=right data-sort-value="0.79" | 790 m || 
|-id=015 bgcolor=#fefefe
| 342015 ||  || — || September 6, 2008 || Catalina || CSS || NYS || align=right data-sort-value="0.72" | 720 m || 
|-id=016 bgcolor=#E9E9E9
| 342016 ||  || — || September 10, 2008 || Siding Spring || SSS || BAR || align=right | 1.8 km || 
|-id=017 bgcolor=#fefefe
| 342017 Ramonin ||  ||  || September 12, 2008 || La Cañada || J. Lacruz || NYS || align=right data-sort-value="0.83" | 830 m || 
|-id=018 bgcolor=#E9E9E9
| 342018 ||  || — || September 3, 2008 || Kitt Peak || Spacewatch || — || align=right | 2.1 km || 
|-id=019 bgcolor=#fefefe
| 342019 ||  || — || September 4, 2008 || Kitt Peak || Spacewatch || — || align=right data-sort-value="0.79" | 790 m || 
|-id=020 bgcolor=#E9E9E9
| 342020 ||  || — || September 5, 2008 || Kitt Peak || Spacewatch || RAF || align=right data-sort-value="0.92" | 920 m || 
|-id=021 bgcolor=#fefefe
| 342021 ||  || — || September 6, 2008 || Kitt Peak || Spacewatch || — || align=right data-sort-value="0.94" | 940 m || 
|-id=022 bgcolor=#fefefe
| 342022 ||  || — || September 7, 2008 || Catalina || CSS || — || align=right | 1.1 km || 
|-id=023 bgcolor=#E9E9E9
| 342023 ||  || — || September 7, 2008 || Mount Lemmon || Mount Lemmon Survey || — || align=right | 1.2 km || 
|-id=024 bgcolor=#fefefe
| 342024 ||  || — || September 7, 2008 || Skylive Obs. || F. Tozzi || — || align=right | 1.0 km || 
|-id=025 bgcolor=#E9E9E9
| 342025 ||  || — || September 2, 2008 || Kitt Peak || Spacewatch || — || align=right data-sort-value="0.75" | 750 m || 
|-id=026 bgcolor=#E9E9E9
| 342026 ||  || — || September 2, 2008 || Kitt Peak || Spacewatch || — || align=right | 1.0 km || 
|-id=027 bgcolor=#E9E9E9
| 342027 ||  || — || September 5, 2008 || Kitt Peak || Spacewatch || — || align=right | 1.1 km || 
|-id=028 bgcolor=#E9E9E9
| 342028 ||  || — || September 2, 2008 || Kitt Peak || Spacewatch || — || align=right | 1.4 km || 
|-id=029 bgcolor=#fefefe
| 342029 ||  || — || September 5, 2008 || Kitt Peak || Spacewatch || — || align=right | 1.0 km || 
|-id=030 bgcolor=#E9E9E9
| 342030 ||  || — || September 6, 2008 || Catalina || CSS || — || align=right | 3.9 km || 
|-id=031 bgcolor=#E9E9E9
| 342031 ||  || — || September 9, 2008 || Catalina || CSS || — || align=right | 1.8 km || 
|-id=032 bgcolor=#fefefe
| 342032 ||  || — || September 3, 2008 || Kitt Peak || Spacewatch || — || align=right data-sort-value="0.81" | 810 m || 
|-id=033 bgcolor=#E9E9E9
| 342033 ||  || — || September 4, 2008 || Kitt Peak || Spacewatch || — || align=right | 1.8 km || 
|-id=034 bgcolor=#fefefe
| 342034 ||  || — || September 4, 2008 || Kitt Peak || Spacewatch || NYS || align=right data-sort-value="0.63" | 630 m || 
|-id=035 bgcolor=#fefefe
| 342035 ||  || — || September 6, 2008 || Kitt Peak || Spacewatch || — || align=right | 2.3 km || 
|-id=036 bgcolor=#fefefe
| 342036 ||  || — || September 6, 2008 || Mount Lemmon || Mount Lemmon Survey || V || align=right data-sort-value="0.73" | 730 m || 
|-id=037 bgcolor=#E9E9E9
| 342037 ||  || — || September 6, 2008 || Mount Lemmon || Mount Lemmon Survey || — || align=right | 1.5 km || 
|-id=038 bgcolor=#E9E9E9
| 342038 ||  || — || September 6, 2008 || Catalina || CSS || — || align=right | 2.5 km || 
|-id=039 bgcolor=#E9E9E9
| 342039 ||  || — || September 7, 2008 || Mount Lemmon || Mount Lemmon Survey || — || align=right | 1.1 km || 
|-id=040 bgcolor=#E9E9E9
| 342040 ||  || — || September 7, 2008 || Mount Lemmon || Mount Lemmon Survey || — || align=right | 1.5 km || 
|-id=041 bgcolor=#E9E9E9
| 342041 ||  || — || September 9, 2008 || Catalina || CSS || EUN || align=right | 1.5 km || 
|-id=042 bgcolor=#E9E9E9
| 342042 ||  || — || September 9, 2008 || Mount Lemmon || Mount Lemmon Survey || — || align=right | 1.4 km || 
|-id=043 bgcolor=#E9E9E9
| 342043 ||  || — || September 3, 2008 || Kitt Peak || Spacewatch || — || align=right | 1.5 km || 
|-id=044 bgcolor=#E9E9E9
| 342044 ||  || — || September 7, 2008 || Catalina || CSS || — || align=right | 1.8 km || 
|-id=045 bgcolor=#E9E9E9
| 342045 ||  || — || September 2, 2008 || Kitt Peak || Spacewatch || — || align=right data-sort-value="0.76" | 760 m || 
|-id=046 bgcolor=#E9E9E9
| 342046 ||  || — || August 22, 2004 || Siding Spring || SSS || — || align=right | 1.5 km || 
|-id=047 bgcolor=#E9E9E9
| 342047 ||  || — || September 7, 2008 || Mount Lemmon || Mount Lemmon Survey || EUN || align=right | 1.3 km || 
|-id=048 bgcolor=#fefefe
| 342048 ||  || — || September 4, 2008 || Kitt Peak || Spacewatch || — || align=right data-sort-value="0.86" | 860 m || 
|-id=049 bgcolor=#fefefe
| 342049 ||  || — || March 10, 2007 || Mount Lemmon || Mount Lemmon Survey || MAS || align=right data-sort-value="0.89" | 890 m || 
|-id=050 bgcolor=#fefefe
| 342050 ||  || — || September 2, 2008 || Kitt Peak || Spacewatch || NYS || align=right data-sort-value="0.63" | 630 m || 
|-id=051 bgcolor=#E9E9E9
| 342051 ||  || — || September 3, 2008 || Kitt Peak || Spacewatch || — || align=right | 1.7 km || 
|-id=052 bgcolor=#fefefe
| 342052 ||  || — || September 8, 2008 || Kitt Peak || Spacewatch || FLO || align=right data-sort-value="0.88" | 880 m || 
|-id=053 bgcolor=#fefefe
| 342053 ||  || — || September 3, 2008 || Kitt Peak || Spacewatch || V || align=right data-sort-value="0.82" | 820 m || 
|-id=054 bgcolor=#fefefe
| 342054 ||  || — || September 5, 2008 || Kitt Peak || Spacewatch || NYS || align=right data-sort-value="0.64" | 640 m || 
|-id=055 bgcolor=#E9E9E9
| 342055 ||  || — || September 4, 2008 || Socorro || LINEAR || — || align=right | 2.0 km || 
|-id=056 bgcolor=#E9E9E9
| 342056 ||  || — || September 8, 2008 || Kitt Peak || Spacewatch || — || align=right | 1.7 km || 
|-id=057 bgcolor=#fefefe
| 342057 ||  || — || September 20, 2008 || Goodricke-Pigott || R. A. Tucker || NYS || align=right data-sort-value="0.88" | 880 m || 
|-id=058 bgcolor=#fefefe
| 342058 ||  || — || September 22, 2008 || Socorro || LINEAR || — || align=right | 1.2 km || 
|-id=059 bgcolor=#fefefe
| 342059 ||  || — || September 22, 2008 || Socorro || LINEAR || V || align=right | 1.0 km || 
|-id=060 bgcolor=#fefefe
| 342060 ||  || — || July 10, 2004 || Palomar || NEAT || — || align=right | 1.1 km || 
|-id=061 bgcolor=#fefefe
| 342061 ||  || — || September 19, 2008 || Kitt Peak || Spacewatch || NYS || align=right data-sort-value="0.55" | 550 m || 
|-id=062 bgcolor=#fefefe
| 342062 ||  || — || September 19, 2008 || Kitt Peak || Spacewatch || — || align=right data-sort-value="0.95" | 950 m || 
|-id=063 bgcolor=#fefefe
| 342063 ||  || — || September 19, 2008 || Kitt Peak || Spacewatch || FLO || align=right data-sort-value="0.69" | 690 m || 
|-id=064 bgcolor=#fefefe
| 342064 ||  || — || September 19, 2008 || Kitt Peak || Spacewatch || NYS || align=right data-sort-value="0.79" | 790 m || 
|-id=065 bgcolor=#fefefe
| 342065 ||  || — || June 20, 2004 || Kitt Peak || Spacewatch || NYS || align=right data-sort-value="0.63" | 630 m || 
|-id=066 bgcolor=#fefefe
| 342066 ||  || — || September 19, 2008 || Kitt Peak || Spacewatch || — || align=right data-sort-value="0.87" | 870 m || 
|-id=067 bgcolor=#fefefe
| 342067 ||  || — || September 19, 2008 || Kitt Peak || Spacewatch || fast? || align=right data-sort-value="0.78" | 780 m || 
|-id=068 bgcolor=#fefefe
| 342068 ||  || — || September 19, 2008 || Kitt Peak || Spacewatch || NYS || align=right data-sort-value="0.63" | 630 m || 
|-id=069 bgcolor=#fefefe
| 342069 ||  || — || September 19, 2008 || Kitt Peak || Spacewatch || V || align=right data-sort-value="0.72" | 720 m || 
|-id=070 bgcolor=#E9E9E9
| 342070 ||  || — || September 19, 2008 || Kitt Peak || Spacewatch || — || align=right | 1.1 km || 
|-id=071 bgcolor=#E9E9E9
| 342071 ||  || — || September 19, 2008 || Kitt Peak || Spacewatch || — || align=right | 1.3 km || 
|-id=072 bgcolor=#fefefe
| 342072 ||  || — || September 20, 2008 || Kitt Peak || Spacewatch || — || align=right | 1.3 km || 
|-id=073 bgcolor=#fefefe
| 342073 ||  || — || September 20, 2008 || Kitt Peak || Spacewatch || V || align=right data-sort-value="0.81" | 810 m || 
|-id=074 bgcolor=#fefefe
| 342074 ||  || — || September 20, 2008 || Kitt Peak || Spacewatch || — || align=right | 1.1 km || 
|-id=075 bgcolor=#fefefe
| 342075 ||  || — || September 20, 2008 || Kitt Peak || Spacewatch || NYS || align=right data-sort-value="0.72" | 720 m || 
|-id=076 bgcolor=#fefefe
| 342076 ||  || — || September 20, 2008 || Catalina || CSS || — || align=right | 1.0 km || 
|-id=077 bgcolor=#fefefe
| 342077 ||  || — || September 20, 2008 || Kitt Peak || Spacewatch || — || align=right | 1.5 km || 
|-id=078 bgcolor=#E9E9E9
| 342078 ||  || — || September 20, 2008 || Mount Lemmon || Mount Lemmon Survey || — || align=right data-sort-value="0.77" | 770 m || 
|-id=079 bgcolor=#E9E9E9
| 342079 ||  || — || September 20, 2008 || Kitt Peak || Spacewatch || — || align=right data-sort-value="0.93" | 930 m || 
|-id=080 bgcolor=#fefefe
| 342080 ||  || — || September 20, 2008 || Kitt Peak || Spacewatch || — || align=right | 1.1 km || 
|-id=081 bgcolor=#fefefe
| 342081 ||  || — || September 20, 2008 || Catalina || CSS || NYS || align=right data-sort-value="0.81" | 810 m || 
|-id=082 bgcolor=#fefefe
| 342082 ||  || — || September 20, 2008 || Catalina || CSS || — || align=right data-sort-value="0.91" | 910 m || 
|-id=083 bgcolor=#E9E9E9
| 342083 ||  || — || September 20, 2008 || Kitt Peak || Spacewatch || HNS || align=right | 1.2 km || 
|-id=084 bgcolor=#E9E9E9
| 342084 ||  || — || September 20, 2008 || Kitt Peak || Spacewatch || — || align=right | 1.1 km || 
|-id=085 bgcolor=#E9E9E9
| 342085 ||  || — || September 20, 2008 || Kitt Peak || Spacewatch || ADE || align=right | 2.7 km || 
|-id=086 bgcolor=#E9E9E9
| 342086 ||  || — || September 20, 2008 || Kitt Peak || Spacewatch || — || align=right | 1.5 km || 
|-id=087 bgcolor=#fefefe
| 342087 ||  || — || September 20, 2008 || Kitt Peak || Spacewatch || — || align=right data-sort-value="0.98" | 980 m || 
|-id=088 bgcolor=#E9E9E9
| 342088 ||  || — || September 20, 2008 || Kitt Peak || Spacewatch || — || align=right | 1.6 km || 
|-id=089 bgcolor=#fefefe
| 342089 ||  || — || September 20, 2008 || Mount Lemmon || Mount Lemmon Survey || — || align=right data-sort-value="0.95" | 950 m || 
|-id=090 bgcolor=#fefefe
| 342090 ||  || — || September 20, 2008 || Mount Lemmon || Mount Lemmon Survey || NYS || align=right data-sort-value="0.94" | 940 m || 
|-id=091 bgcolor=#E9E9E9
| 342091 ||  || — || September 20, 2008 || Mount Lemmon || Mount Lemmon Survey || JUN || align=right data-sort-value="0.99" | 990 m || 
|-id=092 bgcolor=#E9E9E9
| 342092 ||  || — || September 20, 2008 || Mount Lemmon || Mount Lemmon Survey || — || align=right data-sort-value="0.68" | 680 m || 
|-id=093 bgcolor=#E9E9E9
| 342093 ||  || — || September 20, 2008 || Mount Lemmon || Mount Lemmon Survey || — || align=right | 1.0 km || 
|-id=094 bgcolor=#E9E9E9
| 342094 ||  || — || September 20, 2008 || Kitt Peak || Spacewatch || — || align=right | 1.4 km || 
|-id=095 bgcolor=#E9E9E9
| 342095 ||  || — || September 20, 2008 || Kitt Peak || Spacewatch || — || align=right | 1.5 km || 
|-id=096 bgcolor=#E9E9E9
| 342096 ||  || — || September 7, 2008 || Mount Lemmon || Mount Lemmon Survey || — || align=right | 1.3 km || 
|-id=097 bgcolor=#fefefe
| 342097 ||  || — || September 20, 2008 || Catalina || CSS || NYS || align=right data-sort-value="0.79" | 790 m || 
|-id=098 bgcolor=#fefefe
| 342098 ||  || — || September 20, 2008 || Catalina || CSS || — || align=right data-sort-value="0.94" | 940 m || 
|-id=099 bgcolor=#fefefe
| 342099 ||  || — || September 21, 2008 || Kitt Peak || Spacewatch || V || align=right data-sort-value="0.68" | 680 m || 
|-id=100 bgcolor=#E9E9E9
| 342100 ||  || — || September 21, 2008 || Kitt Peak || Spacewatch || KON || align=right | 2.5 km || 
|}

342101–342200 

|-bgcolor=#d6d6d6
| 342101 ||  || — || September 21, 2008 || Kitt Peak || Spacewatch || HYG || align=right | 2.5 km || 
|-id=102 bgcolor=#E9E9E9
| 342102 ||  || — || September 6, 2008 || Mount Lemmon || Mount Lemmon Survey || — || align=right | 2.3 km || 
|-id=103 bgcolor=#E9E9E9
| 342103 ||  || — || September 21, 2008 || Mount Lemmon || Mount Lemmon Survey || — || align=right | 2.9 km || 
|-id=104 bgcolor=#E9E9E9
| 342104 ||  || — || September 21, 2008 || Catalina || CSS || — || align=right | 1.1 km || 
|-id=105 bgcolor=#E9E9E9
| 342105 ||  || — || September 21, 2008 || Catalina || CSS || — || align=right | 1.1 km || 
|-id=106 bgcolor=#E9E9E9
| 342106 ||  || — || September 21, 2008 || Mount Lemmon || Mount Lemmon Survey || EUN || align=right | 1.7 km || 
|-id=107 bgcolor=#fefefe
| 342107 ||  || — || September 22, 2008 || Mount Lemmon || Mount Lemmon Survey || V || align=right data-sort-value="0.95" | 950 m || 
|-id=108 bgcolor=#fefefe
| 342108 ||  || — || September 23, 2008 || Catalina || CSS || — || align=right | 1.5 km || 
|-id=109 bgcolor=#E9E9E9
| 342109 ||  || — || August 24, 2008 || Kitt Peak || Spacewatch || — || align=right | 1.0 km || 
|-id=110 bgcolor=#E9E9E9
| 342110 ||  || — || September 20, 2008 || Kitt Peak || Spacewatch || — || align=right | 1.1 km || 
|-id=111 bgcolor=#E9E9E9
| 342111 ||  || — || September 20, 2008 || Mount Lemmon || Mount Lemmon Survey || — || align=right data-sort-value="0.95" | 950 m || 
|-id=112 bgcolor=#E9E9E9
| 342112 ||  || — || September 21, 2008 || Kitt Peak || Spacewatch || — || align=right | 1.1 km || 
|-id=113 bgcolor=#E9E9E9
| 342113 ||  || — || September 21, 2008 || Kitt Peak || Spacewatch || — || align=right | 1.2 km || 
|-id=114 bgcolor=#fefefe
| 342114 ||  || — || September 21, 2008 || Kitt Peak || Spacewatch || — || align=right | 1.2 km || 
|-id=115 bgcolor=#E9E9E9
| 342115 ||  || — || September 6, 2008 || Catalina || CSS || ADE || align=right | 2.8 km || 
|-id=116 bgcolor=#fefefe
| 342116 ||  || — || September 21, 2008 || Kitt Peak || Spacewatch || — || align=right data-sort-value="0.77" | 770 m || 
|-id=117 bgcolor=#E9E9E9
| 342117 ||  || — || September 21, 2008 || Kitt Peak || Spacewatch || — || align=right | 1.3 km || 
|-id=118 bgcolor=#E9E9E9
| 342118 ||  || — || September 21, 2008 || Mount Lemmon || Mount Lemmon Survey || — || align=right | 1.5 km || 
|-id=119 bgcolor=#E9E9E9
| 342119 ||  || — || September 21, 2008 || Mount Lemmon || Mount Lemmon Survey || MAR || align=right | 1.4 km || 
|-id=120 bgcolor=#E9E9E9
| 342120 ||  || — || September 21, 2008 || Kitt Peak || Spacewatch || HOF || align=right | 2.9 km || 
|-id=121 bgcolor=#E9E9E9
| 342121 ||  || — || September 21, 2008 || Kitt Peak || Spacewatch || — || align=right | 1.3 km || 
|-id=122 bgcolor=#E9E9E9
| 342122 ||  || — || September 21, 2008 || Kitt Peak || Spacewatch || — || align=right | 1.5 km || 
|-id=123 bgcolor=#fefefe
| 342123 ||  || — || September 22, 2008 || Mount Lemmon || Mount Lemmon Survey || — || align=right data-sort-value="0.84" | 840 m || 
|-id=124 bgcolor=#E9E9E9
| 342124 ||  || — || September 22, 2008 || Mount Lemmon || Mount Lemmon Survey || — || align=right data-sort-value="0.93" | 930 m || 
|-id=125 bgcolor=#E9E9E9
| 342125 ||  || — || September 22, 2008 || Mount Lemmon || Mount Lemmon Survey || — || align=right | 4.3 km || 
|-id=126 bgcolor=#E9E9E9
| 342126 ||  || — || September 22, 2008 || Mount Lemmon || Mount Lemmon Survey || — || align=right | 1.2 km || 
|-id=127 bgcolor=#E9E9E9
| 342127 ||  || — || September 22, 2008 || Mount Lemmon || Mount Lemmon Survey || — || align=right data-sort-value="0.88" | 880 m || 
|-id=128 bgcolor=#E9E9E9
| 342128 ||  || — || September 22, 2008 || Mount Lemmon || Mount Lemmon Survey || — || align=right data-sort-value="0.97" | 970 m || 
|-id=129 bgcolor=#E9E9E9
| 342129 ||  || — || September 22, 2008 || Mount Lemmon || Mount Lemmon Survey || — || align=right | 1.1 km || 
|-id=130 bgcolor=#E9E9E9
| 342130 ||  || — || September 22, 2008 || Mount Lemmon || Mount Lemmon Survey || — || align=right data-sort-value="0.76" | 760 m || 
|-id=131 bgcolor=#E9E9E9
| 342131 ||  || — || September 22, 2008 || Mount Lemmon || Mount Lemmon Survey || — || align=right data-sort-value="0.92" | 920 m || 
|-id=132 bgcolor=#E9E9E9
| 342132 ||  || — || September 22, 2008 || Mount Lemmon || Mount Lemmon Survey || — || align=right data-sort-value="0.89" | 890 m || 
|-id=133 bgcolor=#E9E9E9
| 342133 ||  || — || September 22, 2008 || Mount Lemmon || Mount Lemmon Survey || — || align=right | 1.5 km || 
|-id=134 bgcolor=#E9E9E9
| 342134 ||  || — || September 22, 2008 || Kitt Peak || Spacewatch || — || align=right | 1.1 km || 
|-id=135 bgcolor=#E9E9E9
| 342135 ||  || — || September 22, 2008 || Mount Lemmon || Mount Lemmon Survey || — || align=right | 1.4 km || 
|-id=136 bgcolor=#E9E9E9
| 342136 ||  || — || September 22, 2008 || Mount Lemmon || Mount Lemmon Survey || — || align=right | 1.9 km || 
|-id=137 bgcolor=#E9E9E9
| 342137 ||  || — || September 22, 2008 || Kitt Peak || Spacewatch || JUN || align=right | 1.3 km || 
|-id=138 bgcolor=#E9E9E9
| 342138 ||  || — || September 22, 2008 || Kitt Peak || Spacewatch || MAR || align=right | 1.5 km || 
|-id=139 bgcolor=#E9E9E9
| 342139 ||  || — || September 22, 2008 || Kitt Peak || Spacewatch || — || align=right | 1.1 km || 
|-id=140 bgcolor=#E9E9E9
| 342140 ||  || — || September 22, 2008 || Kitt Peak || Spacewatch || — || align=right | 1.8 km || 
|-id=141 bgcolor=#E9E9E9
| 342141 ||  || — || September 22, 2008 || Kitt Peak || Spacewatch || — || align=right | 1.5 km || 
|-id=142 bgcolor=#E9E9E9
| 342142 ||  || — || September 22, 2008 || Kitt Peak || Spacewatch || — || align=right | 1.6 km || 
|-id=143 bgcolor=#E9E9E9
| 342143 ||  || — || September 22, 2008 || Kitt Peak || Spacewatch || — || align=right | 1.0 km || 
|-id=144 bgcolor=#E9E9E9
| 342144 ||  || — || September 22, 2008 || Kitt Peak || Spacewatch || — || align=right | 1.6 km || 
|-id=145 bgcolor=#E9E9E9
| 342145 ||  || — || September 22, 2008 || Kitt Peak || Spacewatch || — || align=right | 1.2 km || 
|-id=146 bgcolor=#fefefe
| 342146 ||  || — || September 22, 2008 || Kitt Peak || Spacewatch || — || align=right data-sort-value="0.71" | 710 m || 
|-id=147 bgcolor=#E9E9E9
| 342147 ||  || — || September 22, 2008 || Kitt Peak || Spacewatch || EUN || align=right | 1.4 km || 
|-id=148 bgcolor=#E9E9E9
| 342148 ||  || — || September 23, 2008 || Kitt Peak || Spacewatch || — || align=right data-sort-value="0.97" | 970 m || 
|-id=149 bgcolor=#fefefe
| 342149 ||  || — || September 23, 2008 || Siding Spring || SSS || — || align=right | 1.0 km || 
|-id=150 bgcolor=#fefefe
| 342150 ||  || — || September 24, 2008 || Catalina || CSS || V || align=right data-sort-value="0.68" | 680 m || 
|-id=151 bgcolor=#E9E9E9
| 342151 ||  || — || September 24, 2008 || Mount Lemmon || Mount Lemmon Survey || — || align=right | 1.5 km || 
|-id=152 bgcolor=#E9E9E9
| 342152 ||  || — || September 24, 2008 || Mount Lemmon || Mount Lemmon Survey || EUN || align=right | 1.3 km || 
|-id=153 bgcolor=#E9E9E9
| 342153 ||  || — || September 24, 2008 || Mount Lemmon || Mount Lemmon Survey || — || align=right | 1.5 km || 
|-id=154 bgcolor=#fefefe
| 342154 ||  || — || September 24, 2008 || Mount Lemmon || Mount Lemmon Survey || — || align=right data-sort-value="0.98" | 980 m || 
|-id=155 bgcolor=#E9E9E9
| 342155 ||  || — || September 24, 2008 || Mount Lemmon || Mount Lemmon Survey || — || align=right | 1.6 km || 
|-id=156 bgcolor=#E9E9E9
| 342156 ||  || — || September 24, 2008 || Mount Lemmon || Mount Lemmon Survey || — || align=right | 1.7 km || 
|-id=157 bgcolor=#E9E9E9
| 342157 ||  || — || September 24, 2008 || Mount Lemmon || Mount Lemmon Survey || — || align=right | 2.6 km || 
|-id=158 bgcolor=#E9E9E9
| 342158 ||  || — || September 26, 2008 || Bergisch Gladbach || W. Bickel || — || align=right | 1.3 km || 
|-id=159 bgcolor=#E9E9E9
| 342159 ||  || — || September 29, 2008 || Desert Moon || B. L. Stevens || — || align=right | 1.7 km || 
|-id=160 bgcolor=#fefefe
| 342160 ||  || — || September 29, 2008 || Dauban || F. Kugel || — || align=right data-sort-value="0.89" | 890 m || 
|-id=161 bgcolor=#fefefe
| 342161 ||  || — || September 22, 2008 || Socorro || LINEAR || NYS || align=right data-sort-value="0.66" | 660 m || 
|-id=162 bgcolor=#E9E9E9
| 342162 ||  || — || September 22, 2008 || Socorro || LINEAR || — || align=right data-sort-value="0.88" | 880 m || 
|-id=163 bgcolor=#E9E9E9
| 342163 ||  || — || September 23, 2008 || Socorro || LINEAR || — || align=right | 1.2 km || 
|-id=164 bgcolor=#fefefe
| 342164 ||  || — || September 24, 2008 || Socorro || LINEAR || NYS || align=right data-sort-value="0.76" | 760 m || 
|-id=165 bgcolor=#E9E9E9
| 342165 ||  || — || September 28, 2008 || Socorro || LINEAR || — || align=right | 1.2 km || 
|-id=166 bgcolor=#fefefe
| 342166 ||  || — || September 28, 2008 || Socorro || LINEAR || NYS || align=right | 1.0 km || 
|-id=167 bgcolor=#E9E9E9
| 342167 ||  || — || September 7, 2008 || Mount Lemmon || Mount Lemmon Survey || — || align=right | 1.1 km || 
|-id=168 bgcolor=#E9E9E9
| 342168 ||  || — || September 28, 2008 || Socorro || LINEAR || — || align=right | 2.3 km || 
|-id=169 bgcolor=#fefefe
| 342169 ||  || — || September 28, 2008 || Socorro || LINEAR || — || align=right data-sort-value="0.87" | 870 m || 
|-id=170 bgcolor=#E9E9E9
| 342170 ||  || — || September 23, 2008 || Mount Lemmon || Mount Lemmon Survey || — || align=right | 1.3 km || 
|-id=171 bgcolor=#E9E9E9
| 342171 ||  || — || September 23, 2008 || Kitt Peak || Spacewatch || — || align=right | 1.0 km || 
|-id=172 bgcolor=#E9E9E9
| 342172 ||  || — || September 24, 2008 || Kitt Peak || Spacewatch || — || align=right | 1.2 km || 
|-id=173 bgcolor=#E9E9E9
| 342173 ||  || — || September 24, 2008 || Kitt Peak || Spacewatch || — || align=right data-sort-value="0.91" | 910 m || 
|-id=174 bgcolor=#E9E9E9
| 342174 ||  || — || September 24, 2008 || Mount Lemmon || Mount Lemmon Survey || ADE || align=right | 3.3 km || 
|-id=175 bgcolor=#E9E9E9
| 342175 ||  || — || September 24, 2008 || Kitt Peak || Spacewatch || — || align=right | 1.00 km || 
|-id=176 bgcolor=#E9E9E9
| 342176 ||  || — || September 24, 2008 || Mount Lemmon || Mount Lemmon Survey || — || align=right data-sort-value="0.87" | 870 m || 
|-id=177 bgcolor=#E9E9E9
| 342177 ||  || — || September 24, 2008 || Mount Lemmon || Mount Lemmon Survey || MAR || align=right data-sort-value="0.84" | 840 m || 
|-id=178 bgcolor=#E9E9E9
| 342178 ||  || — || September 24, 2008 || Mount Lemmon || Mount Lemmon Survey || fast? || align=right | 1.0 km || 
|-id=179 bgcolor=#E9E9E9
| 342179 ||  || — || September 24, 2008 || Kitt Peak || Spacewatch || — || align=right | 1.8 km || 
|-id=180 bgcolor=#E9E9E9
| 342180 ||  || — || September 24, 2008 || Kitt Peak || Spacewatch || — || align=right | 3.2 km || 
|-id=181 bgcolor=#E9E9E9
| 342181 ||  || — || September 25, 2008 || Kitt Peak || Spacewatch || — || align=right | 2.7 km || 
|-id=182 bgcolor=#E9E9E9
| 342182 ||  || — || September 25, 2008 || Kitt Peak || Spacewatch || — || align=right data-sort-value="0.98" | 980 m || 
|-id=183 bgcolor=#E9E9E9
| 342183 ||  || — || September 25, 2008 || Mount Lemmon || Mount Lemmon Survey || — || align=right | 3.1 km || 
|-id=184 bgcolor=#E9E9E9
| 342184 ||  || — || September 25, 2008 || Kitt Peak || Spacewatch || — || align=right | 1.7 km || 
|-id=185 bgcolor=#E9E9E9
| 342185 ||  || — || September 25, 2008 || Kitt Peak || Spacewatch || — || align=right | 1.2 km || 
|-id=186 bgcolor=#E9E9E9
| 342186 ||  || — || September 25, 2008 || Kitt Peak || Spacewatch || WIT || align=right data-sort-value="0.89" | 890 m || 
|-id=187 bgcolor=#E9E9E9
| 342187 ||  || — || September 25, 2008 || Kitt Peak || Spacewatch || — || align=right | 1.5 km || 
|-id=188 bgcolor=#E9E9E9
| 342188 ||  || — || September 26, 2008 || Kitt Peak || Spacewatch || — || align=right | 1.6 km || 
|-id=189 bgcolor=#E9E9E9
| 342189 ||  || — || September 6, 2008 || Mount Lemmon || Mount Lemmon Survey || — || align=right | 1.8 km || 
|-id=190 bgcolor=#E9E9E9
| 342190 ||  || — || September 26, 2008 || Kitt Peak || Spacewatch || — || align=right data-sort-value="0.77" | 770 m || 
|-id=191 bgcolor=#E9E9E9
| 342191 ||  || — || September 26, 2008 || Kitt Peak || Spacewatch || ADE || align=right | 1.7 km || 
|-id=192 bgcolor=#E9E9E9
| 342192 ||  || — || September 26, 2008 || Kitt Peak || Spacewatch || — || align=right | 1.1 km || 
|-id=193 bgcolor=#E9E9E9
| 342193 ||  || — || September 26, 2008 || Kitt Peak || Spacewatch || — || align=right | 1.5 km || 
|-id=194 bgcolor=#E9E9E9
| 342194 ||  || — || September 27, 2008 || Mount Lemmon || Mount Lemmon Survey || — || align=right | 2.8 km || 
|-id=195 bgcolor=#E9E9E9
| 342195 ||  || — || September 27, 2008 || Mount Lemmon || Mount Lemmon Survey || — || align=right | 1.5 km || 
|-id=196 bgcolor=#E9E9E9
| 342196 ||  || — || September 28, 2008 || Mount Lemmon || Mount Lemmon Survey || EUN || align=right | 1.2 km || 
|-id=197 bgcolor=#fefefe
| 342197 ||  || — || September 29, 2008 || Mount Lemmon || Mount Lemmon Survey || — || align=right | 3.3 km || 
|-id=198 bgcolor=#fefefe
| 342198 ||  || — || September 29, 2008 || Kitt Peak || Spacewatch || NYS || align=right data-sort-value="0.69" | 690 m || 
|-id=199 bgcolor=#E9E9E9
| 342199 ||  || — || September 29, 2008 || Mount Lemmon || Mount Lemmon Survey || — || align=right | 1.3 km || 
|-id=200 bgcolor=#E9E9E9
| 342200 ||  || — || September 30, 2008 || La Sagra || OAM Obs. || — || align=right | 1.5 km || 
|}

342201–342300 

|-bgcolor=#E9E9E9
| 342201 ||  || — || September 30, 2008 || La Sagra || OAM Obs. || — || align=right | 1.1 km || 
|-id=202 bgcolor=#fefefe
| 342202 ||  || — || September 30, 2008 || La Sagra || OAM Obs. || NYS || align=right data-sort-value="0.63" | 630 m || 
|-id=203 bgcolor=#fefefe
| 342203 ||  || — || September 25, 2008 || Kitt Peak || Spacewatch || NYS || align=right data-sort-value="0.74" | 740 m || 
|-id=204 bgcolor=#E9E9E9
| 342204 ||  || — || September 26, 2008 || Antares || ARO || — || align=right data-sort-value="0.84" | 840 m || 
|-id=205 bgcolor=#E9E9E9
| 342205 ||  || — || September 26, 2008 || Kitt Peak || Spacewatch || — || align=right data-sort-value="0.90" | 900 m || 
|-id=206 bgcolor=#E9E9E9
| 342206 ||  || — || September 28, 2008 || Mount Lemmon || Mount Lemmon Survey || — || align=right | 1.8 km || 
|-id=207 bgcolor=#fefefe
| 342207 ||  || — || September 28, 2008 || Mount Lemmon || Mount Lemmon Survey || FLO || align=right data-sort-value="0.72" | 720 m || 
|-id=208 bgcolor=#E9E9E9
| 342208 ||  || — || September 29, 2008 || Kitt Peak || Spacewatch || — || align=right data-sort-value="0.94" | 940 m || 
|-id=209 bgcolor=#E9E9E9
| 342209 ||  || — || March 13, 2007 || Mount Lemmon || Mount Lemmon Survey || — || align=right | 1.3 km || 
|-id=210 bgcolor=#E9E9E9
| 342210 ||  || — || September 29, 2008 || Kitt Peak || Spacewatch || — || align=right | 1.0 km || 
|-id=211 bgcolor=#E9E9E9
| 342211 ||  || — || September 29, 2008 || Kitt Peak || Spacewatch || — || align=right | 1.6 km || 
|-id=212 bgcolor=#E9E9E9
| 342212 ||  || — || September 30, 2008 || Catalina || CSS || — || align=right | 2.1 km || 
|-id=213 bgcolor=#fefefe
| 342213 ||  || — || September 24, 2008 || Kitt Peak || Spacewatch || V || align=right data-sort-value="0.80" | 800 m || 
|-id=214 bgcolor=#fefefe
| 342214 ||  || — || September 30, 2008 || La Sagra || OAM Obs. || — || align=right | 1.1 km || 
|-id=215 bgcolor=#E9E9E9
| 342215 ||  || — || September 27, 2008 || Catalina || CSS || HNS || align=right | 1.6 km || 
|-id=216 bgcolor=#E9E9E9
| 342216 ||  || — || September 20, 2008 || Kitt Peak || Spacewatch || — || align=right | 1.2 km || 
|-id=217 bgcolor=#E9E9E9
| 342217 ||  || — || September 21, 2008 || Kitt Peak || Spacewatch || — || align=right | 1.9 km || 
|-id=218 bgcolor=#E9E9E9
| 342218 ||  || — || September 23, 2008 || Kitt Peak || Spacewatch || — || align=right | 1.1 km || 
|-id=219 bgcolor=#E9E9E9
| 342219 ||  || — || September 22, 2008 || Kitt Peak || Spacewatch || — || align=right | 1.2 km || 
|-id=220 bgcolor=#E9E9E9
| 342220 ||  || — || September 22, 2008 || Catalina || CSS || MIT || align=right | 2.3 km || 
|-id=221 bgcolor=#E9E9E9
| 342221 ||  || — || September 23, 2008 || Mount Lemmon || Mount Lemmon Survey || — || align=right | 1.4 km || 
|-id=222 bgcolor=#E9E9E9
| 342222 ||  || — || September 23, 2008 || Mount Lemmon || Mount Lemmon Survey || — || align=right | 1.7 km || 
|-id=223 bgcolor=#E9E9E9
| 342223 ||  || — || September 24, 2008 || Kitt Peak || Spacewatch || — || align=right data-sort-value="0.76" | 760 m || 
|-id=224 bgcolor=#E9E9E9
| 342224 ||  || — || September 24, 2008 || Kitt Peak || Spacewatch || — || align=right data-sort-value="0.92" | 920 m || 
|-id=225 bgcolor=#E9E9E9
| 342225 ||  || — || September 28, 2008 || Mount Lemmon || Mount Lemmon Survey || — || align=right | 1.9 km || 
|-id=226 bgcolor=#E9E9E9
| 342226 ||  || — || September 29, 2008 || Catalina || CSS || — || align=right | 1.3 km || 
|-id=227 bgcolor=#E9E9E9
| 342227 ||  || — || September 21, 2008 || Mount Lemmon || Mount Lemmon Survey || ADE || align=right | 4.1 km || 
|-id=228 bgcolor=#E9E9E9
| 342228 ||  || — || September 22, 2008 || Kitt Peak || Spacewatch || EUN || align=right | 1.2 km || 
|-id=229 bgcolor=#E9E9E9
| 342229 ||  || — || September 23, 2008 || Kitt Peak || Spacewatch || — || align=right | 2.5 km || 
|-id=230 bgcolor=#E9E9E9
| 342230 ||  || — || September 27, 2008 || Catalina || CSS || — || align=right | 1.6 km || 
|-id=231 bgcolor=#E9E9E9
| 342231 ||  || — || September 27, 2008 || Mount Lemmon || Mount Lemmon Survey || EUN || align=right | 1.5 km || 
|-id=232 bgcolor=#E9E9E9
| 342232 ||  || — || September 30, 2008 || Catalina || CSS || — || align=right | 3.8 km || 
|-id=233 bgcolor=#E9E9E9
| 342233 ||  || — || September 23, 2008 || Catalina || CSS || — || align=right | 1.8 km || 
|-id=234 bgcolor=#fefefe
| 342234 ||  || — || September 25, 2008 || Kitt Peak || Spacewatch || — || align=right | 1.1 km || 
|-id=235 bgcolor=#E9E9E9
| 342235 ||  || — || September 30, 2008 || Mount Lemmon || Mount Lemmon Survey || — || align=right | 1.4 km || 
|-id=236 bgcolor=#E9E9E9
| 342236 ||  || — || September 24, 2008 || Mount Lemmon || Mount Lemmon Survey || — || align=right | 3.0 km || 
|-id=237 bgcolor=#E9E9E9
| 342237 ||  || — || September 28, 2008 || Mount Lemmon || Mount Lemmon Survey || AEO || align=right | 1.2 km || 
|-id=238 bgcolor=#E9E9E9
| 342238 ||  || — || September 28, 2008 || Mount Lemmon || Mount Lemmon Survey || — || align=right data-sort-value="0.99" | 990 m || 
|-id=239 bgcolor=#fefefe
| 342239 ||  || — || September 21, 2008 || Mount Lemmon || Mount Lemmon Survey || MAS || align=right data-sort-value="0.78" | 780 m || 
|-id=240 bgcolor=#fefefe
| 342240 ||  || — || September 22, 2008 || Kitt Peak || Spacewatch || — || align=right | 1.3 km || 
|-id=241 bgcolor=#E9E9E9
| 342241 ||  || — || September 24, 2008 || Kitt Peak || Spacewatch || — || align=right | 1.2 km || 
|-id=242 bgcolor=#E9E9E9
| 342242 ||  || — || September 29, 2008 || Kitt Peak || Spacewatch || — || align=right | 1.3 km || 
|-id=243 bgcolor=#E9E9E9
| 342243 ||  || — || September 24, 2008 || Kitt Peak || Spacewatch || ADE || align=right | 3.8 km || 
|-id=244 bgcolor=#E9E9E9
| 342244 ||  || — || September 24, 2008 || Kitt Peak || Spacewatch || PAD || align=right | 1.6 km || 
|-id=245 bgcolor=#E9E9E9
| 342245 ||  || — || September 21, 2008 || Mount Lemmon || Mount Lemmon Survey || — || align=right | 2.8 km || 
|-id=246 bgcolor=#E9E9E9
| 342246 ||  || — || September 21, 2008 || Mount Lemmon || Mount Lemmon Survey || — || align=right | 1.6 km || 
|-id=247 bgcolor=#E9E9E9
| 342247 ||  || — || September 24, 2008 || Kitt Peak || Spacewatch || — || align=right | 2.1 km || 
|-id=248 bgcolor=#E9E9E9
| 342248 ||  || — || September 28, 2008 || Mount Lemmon || Mount Lemmon Survey || — || align=right | 1.3 km || 
|-id=249 bgcolor=#E9E9E9
| 342249 ||  || — || September 21, 2008 || Kitt Peak || Spacewatch || — || align=right | 1.1 km || 
|-id=250 bgcolor=#E9E9E9
| 342250 ||  || — || September 22, 2008 || Mount Lemmon || Mount Lemmon Survey || HNS || align=right | 1.2 km || 
|-id=251 bgcolor=#E9E9E9
| 342251 ||  || — || September 23, 2008 || Catalina || CSS || — || align=right | 3.7 km || 
|-id=252 bgcolor=#fefefe
| 342252 ||  || — || September 24, 2008 || Kitt Peak || Spacewatch || MAS || align=right data-sort-value="0.91" | 910 m || 
|-id=253 bgcolor=#E9E9E9
| 342253 ||  || — || September 26, 2008 || Kitt Peak || Spacewatch || — || align=right data-sort-value="0.97" | 970 m || 
|-id=254 bgcolor=#E9E9E9
| 342254 ||  || — || September 28, 2008 || Catalina || CSS || EUN || align=right | 1.8 km || 
|-id=255 bgcolor=#E9E9E9
| 342255 ||  || — || September 29, 2008 || Catalina || CSS || — || align=right | 1.1 km || 
|-id=256 bgcolor=#E9E9E9
| 342256 ||  || — || September 21, 2008 || Kitt Peak || Spacewatch || — || align=right | 1.2 km || 
|-id=257 bgcolor=#fefefe
| 342257 ||  || — || September 22, 2008 || Mount Lemmon || Mount Lemmon Survey || — || align=right data-sort-value="0.97" | 970 m || 
|-id=258 bgcolor=#E9E9E9
| 342258 ||  || — || September 23, 2008 || Kitt Peak || Spacewatch || — || align=right | 2.9 km || 
|-id=259 bgcolor=#E9E9E9
| 342259 ||  || — || September 23, 2008 || Catalina || CSS || — || align=right | 1.3 km || 
|-id=260 bgcolor=#E9E9E9
| 342260 ||  || — || September 23, 2008 || Kitt Peak || Spacewatch || — || align=right | 1.4 km || 
|-id=261 bgcolor=#E9E9E9
| 342261 ||  || — || September 24, 2008 || Catalina || CSS || — || align=right | 2.4 km || 
|-id=262 bgcolor=#fefefe
| 342262 ||  || — || September 28, 2008 || Socorro || LINEAR || — || align=right data-sort-value="0.91" | 910 m || 
|-id=263 bgcolor=#E9E9E9
| 342263 ||  || — || September 28, 2008 || Mount Lemmon || Mount Lemmon Survey || — || align=right | 1.2 km || 
|-id=264 bgcolor=#E9E9E9
| 342264 ||  || — || September 29, 2008 || Catalina || CSS || — || align=right | 1.6 km || 
|-id=265 bgcolor=#E9E9E9
| 342265 ||  || — || September 29, 2008 || Mount Lemmon || Mount Lemmon Survey || WIT || align=right | 1.1 km || 
|-id=266 bgcolor=#E9E9E9
| 342266 ||  || — || September 25, 2008 || Mount Lemmon || Mount Lemmon Survey || fast || align=right | 1.9 km || 
|-id=267 bgcolor=#E9E9E9
| 342267 ||  || — || September 27, 2008 || Mount Lemmon || Mount Lemmon Survey || — || align=right | 1.6 km || 
|-id=268 bgcolor=#E9E9E9
| 342268 ||  || — || September 27, 2008 || Mount Lemmon || Mount Lemmon Survey || HEN || align=right | 1.1 km || 
|-id=269 bgcolor=#E9E9E9
| 342269 ||  || — || September 29, 2008 || Mount Lemmon || Mount Lemmon Survey || — || align=right | 2.1 km || 
|-id=270 bgcolor=#E9E9E9
| 342270 ||  || — || September 29, 2008 || Mount Lemmon || Mount Lemmon Survey || — || align=right | 1.3 km || 
|-id=271 bgcolor=#E9E9E9
| 342271 ||  || — || October 1, 2008 || La Sagra || OAM Obs. || — || align=right data-sort-value="0.64" | 640 m || 
|-id=272 bgcolor=#E9E9E9
| 342272 ||  || — || October 1, 2008 || Kitt Peak || Spacewatch || — || align=right | 1.2 km || 
|-id=273 bgcolor=#fefefe
| 342273 ||  || — || October 3, 2008 || La Sagra || OAM Obs. || V || align=right | 1.2 km || 
|-id=274 bgcolor=#E9E9E9
| 342274 ||  || — || October 4, 2008 || La Sagra || OAM Obs. || — || align=right | 1.2 km || 
|-id=275 bgcolor=#E9E9E9
| 342275 ||  || — || September 29, 2008 || Catalina || CSS || — || align=right | 1.2 km || 
|-id=276 bgcolor=#fefefe
| 342276 ||  || — || October 5, 2008 || Hibiscus || N. Teamo || — || align=right | 1.0 km || 
|-id=277 bgcolor=#fefefe
| 342277 ||  || — || October 8, 2008 || Tzec Maun || E. Schwab || — || align=right data-sort-value="0.98" | 980 m || 
|-id=278 bgcolor=#fefefe
| 342278 ||  || — || May 5, 2003 || Kitt Peak || Spacewatch || — || align=right | 1.3 km || 
|-id=279 bgcolor=#E9E9E9
| 342279 ||  || — || October 1, 2008 || Mount Lemmon || Mount Lemmon Survey || — || align=right | 1.4 km || 
|-id=280 bgcolor=#E9E9E9
| 342280 ||  || — || October 1, 2008 || Mount Lemmon || Mount Lemmon Survey || JUN || align=right | 1.2 km || 
|-id=281 bgcolor=#E9E9E9
| 342281 ||  || — || September 22, 2008 || Mount Lemmon || Mount Lemmon Survey || BRG || align=right | 1.4 km || 
|-id=282 bgcolor=#E9E9E9
| 342282 ||  || — || October 1, 2008 || Mount Lemmon || Mount Lemmon Survey || — || align=right data-sort-value="0.97" | 970 m || 
|-id=283 bgcolor=#E9E9E9
| 342283 ||  || — || October 1, 2008 || Mount Lemmon || Mount Lemmon Survey || — || align=right | 1.0 km || 
|-id=284 bgcolor=#E9E9E9
| 342284 ||  || — || October 1, 2008 || Mount Lemmon || Mount Lemmon Survey || — || align=right | 2.2 km || 
|-id=285 bgcolor=#E9E9E9
| 342285 ||  || — || October 1, 2008 || Kitt Peak || Spacewatch || PAD || align=right | 1.7 km || 
|-id=286 bgcolor=#fefefe
| 342286 ||  || — || March 20, 2007 || Mount Lemmon || Mount Lemmon Survey || NYS || align=right data-sort-value="0.61" | 610 m || 
|-id=287 bgcolor=#E9E9E9
| 342287 ||  || — || October 2, 2008 || Mount Lemmon || Mount Lemmon Survey || — || align=right data-sort-value="0.97" | 970 m || 
|-id=288 bgcolor=#E9E9E9
| 342288 ||  || — || September 7, 2008 || Mount Lemmon || Mount Lemmon Survey || RAF || align=right | 1.9 km || 
|-id=289 bgcolor=#E9E9E9
| 342289 ||  || — || November 17, 2000 || Kitt Peak || Spacewatch || — || align=right | 2.8 km || 
|-id=290 bgcolor=#E9E9E9
| 342290 ||  || — || September 20, 2008 || Kitt Peak || Spacewatch || HEN || align=right | 1.3 km || 
|-id=291 bgcolor=#E9E9E9
| 342291 ||  || — || October 1, 2008 || Kitt Peak || Spacewatch || — || align=right data-sort-value="0.88" | 880 m || 
|-id=292 bgcolor=#E9E9E9
| 342292 ||  || — || October 1, 2008 || Kitt Peak || Spacewatch || — || align=right | 1.1 km || 
|-id=293 bgcolor=#fefefe
| 342293 ||  || — || October 1, 2008 || Mount Lemmon || Mount Lemmon Survey || Vfast? || align=right data-sort-value="0.92" | 920 m || 
|-id=294 bgcolor=#E9E9E9
| 342294 ||  || — || October 1, 2008 || Kitt Peak || Spacewatch || — || align=right | 2.2 km || 
|-id=295 bgcolor=#E9E9E9
| 342295 ||  || — || October 1, 2008 || Mount Lemmon || Mount Lemmon Survey || — || align=right | 1.2 km || 
|-id=296 bgcolor=#E9E9E9
| 342296 ||  || — || September 6, 2008 || Mount Lemmon || Mount Lemmon Survey || RAF || align=right | 1.1 km || 
|-id=297 bgcolor=#E9E9E9
| 342297 ||  || — || October 1, 2008 || Kitt Peak || Spacewatch || BAR || align=right | 1.5 km || 
|-id=298 bgcolor=#E9E9E9
| 342298 ||  || — || October 1, 2008 || Kitt Peak || Spacewatch || — || align=right | 1.8 km || 
|-id=299 bgcolor=#E9E9E9
| 342299 ||  || — || October 1, 2008 || Kitt Peak || Spacewatch || MAR || align=right | 1.4 km || 
|-id=300 bgcolor=#E9E9E9
| 342300 ||  || — || October 2, 2008 || Kitt Peak || Spacewatch || — || align=right | 1.2 km || 
|}

342301–342400 

|-bgcolor=#E9E9E9
| 342301 ||  || — || October 2, 2008 || Kitt Peak || Spacewatch || — || align=right | 2.7 km || 
|-id=302 bgcolor=#E9E9E9
| 342302 ||  || — || October 2, 2008 || Mount Lemmon || Mount Lemmon Survey || — || align=right data-sort-value="0.74" | 740 m || 
|-id=303 bgcolor=#fefefe
| 342303 ||  || — || October 2, 2008 || Kitt Peak || Spacewatch || — || align=right | 1.00 km || 
|-id=304 bgcolor=#fefefe
| 342304 ||  || — || October 2, 2008 || Kitt Peak || Spacewatch || critical || align=right | 1.0 km || 
|-id=305 bgcolor=#fefefe
| 342305 ||  || — || October 2, 2008 || Kitt Peak || Spacewatch || — || align=right data-sort-value="0.90" | 900 m || 
|-id=306 bgcolor=#E9E9E9
| 342306 ||  || — || October 2, 2008 || Kitt Peak || Spacewatch || — || align=right data-sort-value="0.94" | 940 m || 
|-id=307 bgcolor=#fefefe
| 342307 ||  || — || October 2, 2008 || Catalina || CSS || — || align=right | 1.1 km || 
|-id=308 bgcolor=#E9E9E9
| 342308 ||  || — || September 3, 2008 || Kitt Peak || Spacewatch || ADE || align=right | 2.3 km || 
|-id=309 bgcolor=#fefefe
| 342309 ||  || — || October 2, 2008 || Catalina || CSS || — || align=right data-sort-value="0.79" | 790 m || 
|-id=310 bgcolor=#E9E9E9
| 342310 ||  || — || October 2, 2008 || Kitt Peak || Spacewatch || — || align=right data-sort-value="0.96" | 960 m || 
|-id=311 bgcolor=#E9E9E9
| 342311 ||  || — || October 2, 2008 || Kitt Peak || Spacewatch || — || align=right | 2.9 km || 
|-id=312 bgcolor=#E9E9E9
| 342312 ||  || — || October 2, 2008 || Kitt Peak || Spacewatch || — || align=right data-sort-value="0.90" | 900 m || 
|-id=313 bgcolor=#E9E9E9
| 342313 ||  || — || September 23, 2008 || Kitt Peak || Spacewatch || — || align=right | 2.3 km || 
|-id=314 bgcolor=#E9E9E9
| 342314 ||  || — || October 2, 2008 || Kitt Peak || Spacewatch || — || align=right | 2.2 km || 
|-id=315 bgcolor=#E9E9E9
| 342315 ||  || — || October 2, 2008 || Kitt Peak || Spacewatch || — || align=right | 2.1 km || 
|-id=316 bgcolor=#E9E9E9
| 342316 ||  || — || October 2, 2008 || Kitt Peak || Spacewatch || — || align=right | 1.1 km || 
|-id=317 bgcolor=#E9E9E9
| 342317 ||  || — || October 2, 2008 || Kitt Peak || Spacewatch || — || align=right | 1.9 km || 
|-id=318 bgcolor=#fefefe
| 342318 ||  || — || October 2, 2008 || Mount Lemmon || Mount Lemmon Survey || — || align=right data-sort-value="0.67" | 670 m || 
|-id=319 bgcolor=#E9E9E9
| 342319 ||  || — || October 2, 2008 || Kitt Peak || Spacewatch || — || align=right | 1.8 km || 
|-id=320 bgcolor=#fefefe
| 342320 ||  || — || August 22, 2004 || Siding Spring || SSS || NYS || align=right data-sort-value="0.79" | 790 m || 
|-id=321 bgcolor=#E9E9E9
| 342321 ||  || — || October 3, 2008 || Kitt Peak || Spacewatch || — || align=right data-sort-value="0.93" | 930 m || 
|-id=322 bgcolor=#E9E9E9
| 342322 ||  || — || October 3, 2008 || Kitt Peak || Spacewatch || — || align=right | 1.9 km || 
|-id=323 bgcolor=#E9E9E9
| 342323 ||  || — || October 3, 2008 || Kitt Peak || Spacewatch || — || align=right | 1.2 km || 
|-id=324 bgcolor=#fefefe
| 342324 ||  || — || October 4, 2008 || La Sagra || OAM Obs. || NYS || align=right data-sort-value="0.66" | 660 m || 
|-id=325 bgcolor=#fefefe
| 342325 ||  || — || October 5, 2008 || La Sagra || OAM Obs. || — || align=right data-sort-value="0.89" | 890 m || 
|-id=326 bgcolor=#E9E9E9
| 342326 ||  || — || October 6, 2008 || Kitt Peak || Spacewatch || KON || align=right | 3.4 km || 
|-id=327 bgcolor=#E9E9E9
| 342327 ||  || — || October 6, 2008 || Kitt Peak || Spacewatch || — || align=right | 1.3 km || 
|-id=328 bgcolor=#fefefe
| 342328 ||  || — || October 6, 2008 || Kitt Peak || Spacewatch || MAS || align=right data-sort-value="0.67" | 670 m || 
|-id=329 bgcolor=#fefefe
| 342329 ||  || — || October 6, 2008 || Kitt Peak || Spacewatch || — || align=right data-sort-value="0.87" | 870 m || 
|-id=330 bgcolor=#E9E9E9
| 342330 ||  || — || October 6, 2008 || Catalina || CSS || — || align=right | 1.4 km || 
|-id=331 bgcolor=#E9E9E9
| 342331 ||  || — || October 6, 2008 || Catalina || CSS || — || align=right | 1.2 km || 
|-id=332 bgcolor=#E9E9E9
| 342332 ||  || — || October 6, 2008 || Catalina || CSS || ADE || align=right | 4.0 km || 
|-id=333 bgcolor=#fefefe
| 342333 ||  || — || October 6, 2008 || Kitt Peak || Spacewatch || V || align=right | 1.2 km || 
|-id=334 bgcolor=#E9E9E9
| 342334 ||  || — || September 23, 2008 || Kitt Peak || Spacewatch || — || align=right | 1.2 km || 
|-id=335 bgcolor=#E9E9E9
| 342335 ||  || — || October 6, 2008 || Mount Lemmon || Mount Lemmon Survey || — || align=right | 1.4 km || 
|-id=336 bgcolor=#E9E9E9
| 342336 ||  || — || October 7, 2008 || Kitt Peak || Spacewatch || HEN || align=right | 1.1 km || 
|-id=337 bgcolor=#fefefe
| 342337 ||  || — || October 7, 2008 || Kitt Peak || Spacewatch || NYS || align=right data-sort-value="0.72" | 720 m || 
|-id=338 bgcolor=#E9E9E9
| 342338 ||  || — || October 7, 2008 || Mount Lemmon || Mount Lemmon Survey || — || align=right | 2.2 km || 
|-id=339 bgcolor=#E9E9E9
| 342339 ||  || — || October 7, 2008 || Kitt Peak || Spacewatch || — || align=right data-sort-value="0.95" | 950 m || 
|-id=340 bgcolor=#E9E9E9
| 342340 ||  || — || September 6, 2008 || Catalina || CSS || — || align=right | 2.2 km || 
|-id=341 bgcolor=#E9E9E9
| 342341 ||  || — || October 8, 2008 || Mount Lemmon || Mount Lemmon Survey || — || align=right | 2.0 km || 
|-id=342 bgcolor=#E9E9E9
| 342342 ||  || — || October 8, 2008 || Mount Lemmon || Mount Lemmon Survey || — || align=right | 3.6 km || 
|-id=343 bgcolor=#E9E9E9
| 342343 ||  || — || October 8, 2008 || Mount Lemmon || Mount Lemmon Survey || — || align=right | 1.1 km || 
|-id=344 bgcolor=#E9E9E9
| 342344 ||  || — || September 22, 2008 || Kitt Peak || Spacewatch || ADE || align=right | 2.5 km || 
|-id=345 bgcolor=#E9E9E9
| 342345 ||  || — || October 4, 2008 || La Sagra || OAM Obs. || MAR || align=right | 1.7 km || 
|-id=346 bgcolor=#E9E9E9
| 342346 ||  || — || October 10, 2008 || Kitt Peak || Spacewatch || — || align=right | 1.4 km || 
|-id=347 bgcolor=#E9E9E9
| 342347 ||  || — || October 2, 2008 || Kitt Peak || Spacewatch || — || align=right | 1.4 km || 
|-id=348 bgcolor=#E9E9E9
| 342348 ||  || — || October 4, 2008 || La Sagra || OAM Obs. || — || align=right data-sort-value="0.98" | 980 m || 
|-id=349 bgcolor=#E9E9E9
| 342349 ||  || — || October 6, 2008 || Mount Lemmon || Mount Lemmon Survey || — || align=right | 1.2 km || 
|-id=350 bgcolor=#E9E9E9
| 342350 ||  || — || October 1, 2008 || Mount Lemmon || Mount Lemmon Survey || HEN || align=right | 1.1 km || 
|-id=351 bgcolor=#E9E9E9
| 342351 ||  || — || October 7, 2008 || Catalina || CSS || MAR || align=right | 1.2 km || 
|-id=352 bgcolor=#E9E9E9
| 342352 ||  || — || October 8, 2008 || Mount Lemmon || Mount Lemmon Survey || — || align=right data-sort-value="0.96" | 960 m || 
|-id=353 bgcolor=#E9E9E9
| 342353 ||  || — || October 8, 2008 || Catalina || CSS || ADE || align=right | 3.6 km || 
|-id=354 bgcolor=#E9E9E9
| 342354 ||  || — || October 9, 2008 || Mount Lemmon || Mount Lemmon Survey || — || align=right | 1.9 km || 
|-id=355 bgcolor=#E9E9E9
| 342355 ||  || — || October 9, 2008 || Catalina || CSS || — || align=right | 1.1 km || 
|-id=356 bgcolor=#E9E9E9
| 342356 ||  || — || October 24, 2005 || Mauna Kea || A. Boattini || EUN || align=right | 1.6 km || 
|-id=357 bgcolor=#d6d6d6
| 342357 ||  || — || October 8, 2008 || Catalina || CSS || HYG || align=right | 3.6 km || 
|-id=358 bgcolor=#E9E9E9
| 342358 ||  || — || October 1, 2008 || Kitt Peak || Spacewatch || — || align=right data-sort-value="0.84" | 840 m || 
|-id=359 bgcolor=#E9E9E9
| 342359 ||  || — || October 1, 2008 || Catalina || CSS || — || align=right | 2.2 km || 
|-id=360 bgcolor=#E9E9E9
| 342360 ||  || — || October 1, 2008 || Catalina || CSS || EUN || align=right | 1.7 km || 
|-id=361 bgcolor=#E9E9E9
| 342361 ||  || — || October 2, 2008 || Mount Lemmon || Mount Lemmon Survey || — || align=right | 1.5 km || 
|-id=362 bgcolor=#E9E9E9
| 342362 ||  || — || October 6, 2008 || Catalina || CSS || — || align=right | 4.3 km || 
|-id=363 bgcolor=#fefefe
| 342363 ||  || — || October 6, 2008 || Mount Lemmon || Mount Lemmon Survey || — || align=right | 1.1 km || 
|-id=364 bgcolor=#E9E9E9
| 342364 ||  || — || October 6, 2008 || Mount Lemmon || Mount Lemmon Survey || — || align=right | 1.2 km || 
|-id=365 bgcolor=#fefefe
| 342365 ||  || — || October 9, 2008 || Kitt Peak || Spacewatch || V || align=right data-sort-value="0.84" | 840 m || 
|-id=366 bgcolor=#E9E9E9
| 342366 ||  || — || October 10, 2008 || Mount Lemmon || Mount Lemmon Survey || — || align=right | 2.7 km || 
|-id=367 bgcolor=#E9E9E9
| 342367 ||  || — || October 10, 2008 || Mount Lemmon || Mount Lemmon Survey || — || align=right | 2.6 km || 
|-id=368 bgcolor=#E9E9E9
| 342368 ||  || — || October 20, 2008 || Majdanak || Majdanak Obs. || — || align=right | 1.1 km || 
|-id=369 bgcolor=#E9E9E9
| 342369 ||  || — || October 24, 2008 || Sierra Stars || F. Tozzi || — || align=right | 1.4 km || 
|-id=370 bgcolor=#E9E9E9
| 342370 ||  || — || October 24, 2008 || Sierra Stars || F. Tozzi || — || align=right | 1.8 km || 
|-id=371 bgcolor=#E9E9E9
| 342371 ||  || — || October 25, 2008 || Great Shefford || P. Birtwhistle || EUN || align=right | 1.4 km || 
|-id=372 bgcolor=#E9E9E9
| 342372 Titia ||  ||  || October 25, 2008 || Dauban || F. Kugel || — || align=right data-sort-value="0.93" | 930 m || 
|-id=373 bgcolor=#E9E9E9
| 342373 ||  || — || October 17, 2008 || Kitt Peak || Spacewatch || MAR || align=right data-sort-value="0.98" | 980 m || 
|-id=374 bgcolor=#E9E9E9
| 342374 ||  || — || October 17, 2008 || Kitt Peak || Spacewatch || — || align=right data-sort-value="0.86" | 860 m || 
|-id=375 bgcolor=#E9E9E9
| 342375 ||  || — || October 18, 2008 || Kitt Peak || Spacewatch || — || align=right | 1.5 km || 
|-id=376 bgcolor=#E9E9E9
| 342376 ||  || — || October 18, 2008 || Kitt Peak || Spacewatch || — || align=right data-sort-value="0.93" | 930 m || 
|-id=377 bgcolor=#E9E9E9
| 342377 ||  || — || October 19, 2008 || Kitt Peak || Spacewatch || — || align=right data-sort-value="0.98" | 980 m || 
|-id=378 bgcolor=#E9E9E9
| 342378 ||  || — || October 20, 2008 || Kitt Peak || Spacewatch || — || align=right | 1.3 km || 
|-id=379 bgcolor=#E9E9E9
| 342379 ||  || — || October 20, 2008 || Kitt Peak || Spacewatch || — || align=right | 1.1 km || 
|-id=380 bgcolor=#E9E9E9
| 342380 ||  || — || October 20, 2008 || Kitt Peak || Spacewatch || — || align=right | 2.1 km || 
|-id=381 bgcolor=#E9E9E9
| 342381 ||  || — || October 20, 2008 || Kitt Peak || Spacewatch || — || align=right | 1.1 km || 
|-id=382 bgcolor=#E9E9E9
| 342382 ||  || — || October 20, 2008 || Kitt Peak || Spacewatch || — || align=right | 1.4 km || 
|-id=383 bgcolor=#E9E9E9
| 342383 ||  || — || October 20, 2008 || Kitt Peak || Spacewatch || WIT || align=right | 1.1 km || 
|-id=384 bgcolor=#E9E9E9
| 342384 ||  || — || October 20, 2008 || Kitt Peak || Spacewatch || — || align=right | 1.5 km || 
|-id=385 bgcolor=#E9E9E9
| 342385 ||  || — || October 20, 2008 || Kitt Peak || Spacewatch || — || align=right | 1.9 km || 
|-id=386 bgcolor=#E9E9E9
| 342386 ||  || — || October 20, 2008 || Kitt Peak || Spacewatch || — || align=right | 1.3 km || 
|-id=387 bgcolor=#E9E9E9
| 342387 ||  || — || October 20, 2008 || Kitt Peak || Spacewatch || — || align=right | 3.5 km || 
|-id=388 bgcolor=#E9E9E9
| 342388 ||  || — || October 20, 2008 || Kitt Peak || Spacewatch || — || align=right | 2.2 km || 
|-id=389 bgcolor=#E9E9E9
| 342389 ||  || — || October 20, 2008 || Kitt Peak || Spacewatch || — || align=right | 2.2 km || 
|-id=390 bgcolor=#E9E9E9
| 342390 ||  || — || October 20, 2008 || Kitt Peak || Spacewatch || — || align=right | 1.0 km || 
|-id=391 bgcolor=#E9E9E9
| 342391 ||  || — || October 20, 2008 || Kitt Peak || Spacewatch || RAF || align=right | 1.2 km || 
|-id=392 bgcolor=#E9E9E9
| 342392 ||  || — || October 20, 2008 || Kitt Peak || Spacewatch || — || align=right data-sort-value="0.99" | 990 m || 
|-id=393 bgcolor=#E9E9E9
| 342393 ||  || — || October 20, 2008 || Kitt Peak || Spacewatch || — || align=right | 1.0 km || 
|-id=394 bgcolor=#E9E9E9
| 342394 ||  || — || October 20, 2008 || Kitt Peak || Spacewatch || — || align=right | 3.6 km || 
|-id=395 bgcolor=#E9E9E9
| 342395 ||  || — || October 20, 2008 || Kitt Peak || Spacewatch || — || align=right | 1.6 km || 
|-id=396 bgcolor=#E9E9E9
| 342396 ||  || — || October 20, 2008 || Mount Lemmon || Mount Lemmon Survey || — || align=right data-sort-value="0.72" | 720 m || 
|-id=397 bgcolor=#E9E9E9
| 342397 ||  || — || October 20, 2008 || Mount Lemmon || Mount Lemmon Survey || — || align=right | 1.4 km || 
|-id=398 bgcolor=#E9E9E9
| 342398 ||  || — || October 20, 2008 || Kitt Peak || Spacewatch || MAR || align=right | 1.6 km || 
|-id=399 bgcolor=#E9E9E9
| 342399 ||  || — || October 20, 2008 || Mount Lemmon || Mount Lemmon Survey || — || align=right | 1.7 km || 
|-id=400 bgcolor=#E9E9E9
| 342400 ||  || — || September 9, 2008 || Mount Lemmon || Mount Lemmon Survey || — || align=right | 1.7 km || 
|}

342401–342500 

|-bgcolor=#E9E9E9
| 342401 ||  || — || October 20, 2008 || Kitt Peak || Spacewatch || — || align=right | 3.2 km || 
|-id=402 bgcolor=#E9E9E9
| 342402 ||  || — || October 20, 2008 || Lulin || LUSS || — || align=right | 1.5 km || 
|-id=403 bgcolor=#fefefe
| 342403 ||  || — || October 21, 2008 || Kitt Peak || Spacewatch || — || align=right | 1.0 km || 
|-id=404 bgcolor=#fefefe
| 342404 ||  || — || October 21, 2008 || Mount Lemmon || Mount Lemmon Survey || — || align=right data-sort-value="0.90" | 900 m || 
|-id=405 bgcolor=#fefefe
| 342405 ||  || — || October 21, 2008 || Mount Lemmon || Mount Lemmon Survey || NYS || align=right data-sort-value="0.66" | 660 m || 
|-id=406 bgcolor=#E9E9E9
| 342406 ||  || — || October 21, 2008 || Kitt Peak || Spacewatch || — || align=right | 2.2 km || 
|-id=407 bgcolor=#E9E9E9
| 342407 ||  || — || October 21, 2008 || Kitt Peak || Spacewatch || — || align=right | 1.3 km || 
|-id=408 bgcolor=#fefefe
| 342408 ||  || — || October 21, 2008 || Mount Lemmon || Mount Lemmon Survey || — || align=right | 1.2 km || 
|-id=409 bgcolor=#E9E9E9
| 342409 ||  || — || October 21, 2008 || Mount Lemmon || Mount Lemmon Survey || KON || align=right | 2.5 km || 
|-id=410 bgcolor=#E9E9E9
| 342410 ||  || — || October 21, 2008 || Kitt Peak || Spacewatch || — || align=right | 1.6 km || 
|-id=411 bgcolor=#E9E9E9
| 342411 ||  || — || October 21, 2008 || Kitt Peak || Spacewatch || — || align=right | 1.7 km || 
|-id=412 bgcolor=#E9E9E9
| 342412 ||  || — || October 21, 2008 || Kitt Peak || Spacewatch || — || align=right | 1.6 km || 
|-id=413 bgcolor=#E9E9E9
| 342413 ||  || — || October 21, 2008 || Kitt Peak || Spacewatch || — || align=right | 1.1 km || 
|-id=414 bgcolor=#E9E9E9
| 342414 ||  || — || October 21, 2008 || Kitt Peak || Spacewatch || ADE || align=right | 3.0 km || 
|-id=415 bgcolor=#E9E9E9
| 342415 ||  || — || October 21, 2008 || Kitt Peak || Spacewatch || — || align=right | 3.6 km || 
|-id=416 bgcolor=#E9E9E9
| 342416 ||  || — || October 21, 2008 || Kitt Peak || Spacewatch || — || align=right | 2.0 km || 
|-id=417 bgcolor=#E9E9E9
| 342417 ||  || — || October 21, 2008 || Kitt Peak || Spacewatch || WIT || align=right | 1.1 km || 
|-id=418 bgcolor=#E9E9E9
| 342418 ||  || — || October 21, 2008 || Mount Lemmon || Mount Lemmon Survey || WIT || align=right | 1.1 km || 
|-id=419 bgcolor=#E9E9E9
| 342419 ||  || — || October 21, 2008 || Mount Lemmon || Mount Lemmon Survey || — || align=right | 1.2 km || 
|-id=420 bgcolor=#E9E9E9
| 342420 ||  || — || October 21, 2008 || Mount Lemmon || Mount Lemmon Survey || — || align=right | 1.6 km || 
|-id=421 bgcolor=#E9E9E9
| 342421 ||  || — || October 21, 2008 || Kitt Peak || Spacewatch || — || align=right | 2.6 km || 
|-id=422 bgcolor=#E9E9E9
| 342422 ||  || — || October 21, 2008 || Kitt Peak || Spacewatch || EUN || align=right | 1.8 km || 
|-id=423 bgcolor=#E9E9E9
| 342423 ||  || — || October 21, 2008 || Kitt Peak || Spacewatch || — || align=right | 1.2 km || 
|-id=424 bgcolor=#E9E9E9
| 342424 ||  || — || October 21, 2008 || Kitt Peak || Spacewatch || — || align=right | 1.1 km || 
|-id=425 bgcolor=#E9E9E9
| 342425 ||  || — || October 21, 2008 || Kitt Peak || Spacewatch || KAZ || align=right | 1.4 km || 
|-id=426 bgcolor=#E9E9E9
| 342426 ||  || — || September 23, 2008 || Mount Lemmon || Mount Lemmon Survey || — || align=right | 1.0 km || 
|-id=427 bgcolor=#E9E9E9
| 342427 ||  || — || October 23, 2008 || Kitt Peak || Spacewatch || — || align=right | 1.9 km || 
|-id=428 bgcolor=#E9E9E9
| 342428 ||  || — || October 23, 2008 || Mount Lemmon || Mount Lemmon Survey || — || align=right | 1.6 km || 
|-id=429 bgcolor=#E9E9E9
| 342429 ||  || — || October 23, 2008 || Lulin || LUSS || — || align=right | 1.2 km || 
|-id=430 bgcolor=#E9E9E9
| 342430 ||  || — || October 24, 2008 || Mount Lemmon || Mount Lemmon Survey || — || align=right | 1.3 km || 
|-id=431 bgcolor=#E9E9E9
| 342431 Hilo ||  ||  || October 25, 2008 || Heppenheim || Starkenburg Obs. || — || align=right | 2.1 km || 
|-id=432 bgcolor=#E9E9E9
| 342432 ||  || — || September 29, 2008 || Catalina || CSS || — || align=right | 3.4 km || 
|-id=433 bgcolor=#E9E9E9
| 342433 ||  || — || October 24, 2008 || Socorro || LINEAR || — || align=right | 3.6 km || 
|-id=434 bgcolor=#E9E9E9
| 342434 ||  || — || March 15, 2007 || Mount Lemmon || Mount Lemmon Survey || — || align=right | 2.2 km || 
|-id=435 bgcolor=#E9E9E9
| 342435 ||  || — || October 25, 2008 || Socorro || LINEAR || — || align=right | 2.7 km || 
|-id=436 bgcolor=#E9E9E9
| 342436 ||  || — || October 25, 2008 || Socorro || LINEAR || — || align=right | 2.1 km || 
|-id=437 bgcolor=#E9E9E9
| 342437 ||  || — || October 25, 2008 || Socorro || LINEAR || RAF || align=right | 1.1 km || 
|-id=438 bgcolor=#E9E9E9
| 342438 ||  || — || October 26, 2008 || Socorro || LINEAR || JUN || align=right | 1.2 km || 
|-id=439 bgcolor=#E9E9E9
| 342439 ||  || — || October 26, 2008 || Socorro || LINEAR || JUN || align=right | 1.3 km || 
|-id=440 bgcolor=#E9E9E9
| 342440 ||  || — || October 28, 2008 || Kachina || J. Hobart || — || align=right | 1.6 km || 
|-id=441 bgcolor=#fefefe
| 342441 ||  || — || October 25, 2008 || Kitt Peak || Spacewatch || — || align=right | 1.0 km || 
|-id=442 bgcolor=#E9E9E9
| 342442 ||  || — || September 22, 2008 || Kitt Peak || Spacewatch || — || align=right | 1.4 km || 
|-id=443 bgcolor=#E9E9E9
| 342443 ||  || — || October 26, 2008 || Socorro || LINEAR || — || align=right | 2.1 km || 
|-id=444 bgcolor=#E9E9E9
| 342444 ||  || — || October 26, 2008 || Socorro || LINEAR || — || align=right | 1.2 km || 
|-id=445 bgcolor=#E9E9E9
| 342445 ||  || — || October 26, 2008 || Socorro || LINEAR || — || align=right | 3.9 km || 
|-id=446 bgcolor=#E9E9E9
| 342446 ||  || — || October 25, 2008 || Catalina || CSS || — || align=right | 1.9 km || 
|-id=447 bgcolor=#E9E9E9
| 342447 ||  || — || October 28, 2008 || Socorro || LINEAR || — || align=right | 1.9 km || 
|-id=448 bgcolor=#E9E9E9
| 342448 ||  || — || October 27, 2008 || Bisei SG Center || BATTeRS || — || align=right | 1.7 km || 
|-id=449 bgcolor=#E9E9E9
| 342449 ||  || — || October 20, 2008 || Kitt Peak || Spacewatch || — || align=right | 1.1 km || 
|-id=450 bgcolor=#E9E9E9
| 342450 ||  || — || October 22, 2008 || Kitt Peak || Spacewatch || — || align=right | 1.6 km || 
|-id=451 bgcolor=#E9E9E9
| 342451 ||  || — || October 22, 2008 || Kitt Peak || Spacewatch || — || align=right | 3.8 km || 
|-id=452 bgcolor=#fefefe
| 342452 ||  || — || October 22, 2008 || Kitt Peak || Spacewatch || V || align=right data-sort-value="0.84" | 840 m || 
|-id=453 bgcolor=#E9E9E9
| 342453 ||  || — || October 22, 2008 || Kitt Peak || Spacewatch || — || align=right | 2.0 km || 
|-id=454 bgcolor=#E9E9E9
| 342454 ||  || — || October 22, 2008 || Kitt Peak || Spacewatch || — || align=right | 3.1 km || 
|-id=455 bgcolor=#fefefe
| 342455 ||  || — || October 22, 2008 || Kitt Peak || Spacewatch || V || align=right data-sort-value="0.92" | 920 m || 
|-id=456 bgcolor=#E9E9E9
| 342456 ||  || — || October 22, 2008 || Kitt Peak || Spacewatch || — || align=right | 1.4 km || 
|-id=457 bgcolor=#E9E9E9
| 342457 ||  || — || October 22, 2008 || Kitt Peak || Spacewatch || — || align=right | 1.4 km || 
|-id=458 bgcolor=#E9E9E9
| 342458 ||  || — || October 22, 2008 || Kitt Peak || Spacewatch || — || align=right | 2.3 km || 
|-id=459 bgcolor=#E9E9E9
| 342459 ||  || — || October 22, 2008 || Kitt Peak || Spacewatch || — || align=right | 1.00 km || 
|-id=460 bgcolor=#E9E9E9
| 342460 ||  || — || October 22, 2008 || Kitt Peak || Spacewatch || — || align=right | 1.1 km || 
|-id=461 bgcolor=#E9E9E9
| 342461 ||  || — || October 22, 2008 || Kitt Peak || Spacewatch || HOF || align=right | 2.7 km || 
|-id=462 bgcolor=#E9E9E9
| 342462 ||  || — || October 22, 2008 || Kitt Peak || Spacewatch || — || align=right | 2.1 km || 
|-id=463 bgcolor=#E9E9E9
| 342463 ||  || — || October 22, 2008 || Kitt Peak || Spacewatch || — || align=right | 2.5 km || 
|-id=464 bgcolor=#E9E9E9
| 342464 ||  || — || October 22, 2008 || Kitt Peak || Spacewatch || — || align=right | 1.9 km || 
|-id=465 bgcolor=#E9E9E9
| 342465 ||  || — || October 22, 2008 || Kitt Peak || Spacewatch || — || align=right | 2.5 km || 
|-id=466 bgcolor=#E9E9E9
| 342466 ||  || — || October 22, 2008 || Kitt Peak || Spacewatch || — || align=right | 2.0 km || 
|-id=467 bgcolor=#E9E9E9
| 342467 ||  || — || October 22, 2008 || Kitt Peak || Spacewatch || — || align=right | 2.0 km || 
|-id=468 bgcolor=#E9E9E9
| 342468 ||  || — || October 22, 2008 || Kitt Peak || Spacewatch || EUN || align=right | 1.8 km || 
|-id=469 bgcolor=#E9E9E9
| 342469 ||  || — || October 22, 2008 || Kitt Peak || Spacewatch || EUN || align=right | 1.5 km || 
|-id=470 bgcolor=#E9E9E9
| 342470 ||  || — || October 22, 2008 || Kitt Peak || Spacewatch || NEM || align=right | 2.8 km || 
|-id=471 bgcolor=#E9E9E9
| 342471 ||  || — || October 22, 2008 || Kitt Peak || Spacewatch || — || align=right | 1.7 km || 
|-id=472 bgcolor=#E9E9E9
| 342472 ||  || — || October 23, 2008 || Kitt Peak || Spacewatch || — || align=right | 1.6 km || 
|-id=473 bgcolor=#E9E9E9
| 342473 ||  || — || October 23, 2008 || Kitt Peak || Spacewatch || — || align=right data-sort-value="0.87" | 870 m || 
|-id=474 bgcolor=#E9E9E9
| 342474 ||  || — || October 23, 2008 || Kitt Peak || Spacewatch || HEN || align=right data-sort-value="0.93" | 930 m || 
|-id=475 bgcolor=#E9E9E9
| 342475 ||  || — || October 23, 2008 || Kitt Peak || Spacewatch || — || align=right | 1.3 km || 
|-id=476 bgcolor=#E9E9E9
| 342476 ||  || — || October 2, 2008 || Mount Lemmon || Mount Lemmon Survey || — || align=right | 1.7 km || 
|-id=477 bgcolor=#E9E9E9
| 342477 ||  || — || October 23, 2008 || Kitt Peak || Spacewatch || — || align=right | 1.9 km || 
|-id=478 bgcolor=#E9E9E9
| 342478 ||  || — || October 23, 2008 || Kitt Peak || Spacewatch || — || align=right | 1.3 km || 
|-id=479 bgcolor=#E9E9E9
| 342479 ||  || — || October 23, 2008 || Kitt Peak || Spacewatch || — || align=right data-sort-value="0.98" | 980 m || 
|-id=480 bgcolor=#E9E9E9
| 342480 ||  || — || October 23, 2008 || Kitt Peak || Spacewatch || — || align=right | 1.3 km || 
|-id=481 bgcolor=#E9E9E9
| 342481 ||  || — || October 23, 2008 || Kitt Peak || Spacewatch || — || align=right | 1.0 km || 
|-id=482 bgcolor=#E9E9E9
| 342482 ||  || — || October 23, 2008 || Kitt Peak || Spacewatch || — || align=right | 1.4 km || 
|-id=483 bgcolor=#fefefe
| 342483 ||  || — || October 23, 2008 || Mount Lemmon || Mount Lemmon Survey || MAS || align=right | 1.0 km || 
|-id=484 bgcolor=#E9E9E9
| 342484 ||  || — || October 23, 2008 || Kitt Peak || Spacewatch || — || align=right | 3.4 km || 
|-id=485 bgcolor=#E9E9E9
| 342485 ||  || — || October 23, 2008 || Mount Lemmon || Mount Lemmon Survey || — || align=right data-sort-value="0.89" | 890 m || 
|-id=486 bgcolor=#E9E9E9
| 342486 ||  || — || October 23, 2008 || Mount Lemmon || Mount Lemmon Survey || — || align=right | 1.5 km || 
|-id=487 bgcolor=#E9E9E9
| 342487 ||  || — || October 23, 2008 || Kitt Peak || Spacewatch || — || align=right | 3.3 km || 
|-id=488 bgcolor=#E9E9E9
| 342488 ||  || — || October 23, 2008 || Kitt Peak || Spacewatch || — || align=right | 2.4 km || 
|-id=489 bgcolor=#E9E9E9
| 342489 ||  || — || October 23, 2008 || Kitt Peak || Spacewatch || — || align=right | 1.3 km || 
|-id=490 bgcolor=#E9E9E9
| 342490 ||  || — || October 23, 2008 || Kitt Peak || Spacewatch || — || align=right | 1.6 km || 
|-id=491 bgcolor=#E9E9E9
| 342491 ||  || — || January 5, 2006 || Mount Lemmon || Mount Lemmon Survey || — || align=right | 1.9 km || 
|-id=492 bgcolor=#E9E9E9
| 342492 ||  || — || October 24, 2008 || Kitt Peak || Spacewatch || — || align=right | 1.9 km || 
|-id=493 bgcolor=#E9E9E9
| 342493 ||  || — || October 24, 2008 || Kitt Peak || Spacewatch || — || align=right data-sort-value="0.94" | 940 m || 
|-id=494 bgcolor=#fefefe
| 342494 ||  || — || October 24, 2008 || Catalina || CSS || V || align=right data-sort-value="0.91" | 910 m || 
|-id=495 bgcolor=#E9E9E9
| 342495 ||  || — || October 24, 2008 || Catalina || CSS || NEM || align=right | 3.0 km || 
|-id=496 bgcolor=#E9E9E9
| 342496 ||  || — || October 24, 2008 || Kitt Peak || Spacewatch || — || align=right | 2.4 km || 
|-id=497 bgcolor=#E9E9E9
| 342497 ||  || — || October 24, 2008 || Kitt Peak || Spacewatch || — || align=right | 2.1 km || 
|-id=498 bgcolor=#E9E9E9
| 342498 ||  || — || October 24, 2008 || Kitt Peak || Spacewatch || — || align=right | 2.4 km || 
|-id=499 bgcolor=#E9E9E9
| 342499 ||  || — || October 24, 2008 || Kitt Peak || Spacewatch || — || align=right | 2.5 km || 
|-id=500 bgcolor=#E9E9E9
| 342500 ||  || — || May 26, 2007 || Mount Lemmon || Mount Lemmon Survey || EUN || align=right | 1.6 km || 
|}

342501–342600 

|-bgcolor=#E9E9E9
| 342501 ||  || — || October 24, 2008 || Catalina || CSS || — || align=right | 2.4 km || 
|-id=502 bgcolor=#E9E9E9
| 342502 ||  || — || October 24, 2008 || Mount Lemmon || Mount Lemmon Survey || — || align=right data-sort-value="0.94" | 940 m || 
|-id=503 bgcolor=#E9E9E9
| 342503 ||  || — || October 24, 2008 || Mount Lemmon || Mount Lemmon Survey || — || align=right | 2.5 km || 
|-id=504 bgcolor=#E9E9E9
| 342504 ||  || — || October 24, 2008 || Mount Lemmon || Mount Lemmon Survey || — || align=right | 1.7 km || 
|-id=505 bgcolor=#E9E9E9
| 342505 ||  || — || October 24, 2008 || Mount Lemmon || Mount Lemmon Survey || GEF || align=right | 1.3 km || 
|-id=506 bgcolor=#E9E9E9
| 342506 ||  || — || October 24, 2008 || Kitt Peak || Spacewatch || — || align=right | 2.9 km || 
|-id=507 bgcolor=#E9E9E9
| 342507 ||  || — || October 24, 2008 || Kitt Peak || Spacewatch || — || align=right | 1.4 km || 
|-id=508 bgcolor=#E9E9E9
| 342508 ||  || — || October 24, 2008 || Kitt Peak || Spacewatch || — || align=right data-sort-value="0.90" | 900 m || 
|-id=509 bgcolor=#E9E9E9
| 342509 ||  || — || October 24, 2008 || Mount Lemmon || Mount Lemmon Survey || — || align=right data-sort-value="0.86" | 860 m || 
|-id=510 bgcolor=#E9E9E9
| 342510 ||  || — || October 24, 2008 || Kitt Peak || Spacewatch || — || align=right | 1.6 km || 
|-id=511 bgcolor=#E9E9E9
| 342511 ||  || — || October 24, 2008 || Kitt Peak || Spacewatch || — || align=right | 1.5 km || 
|-id=512 bgcolor=#E9E9E9
| 342512 ||  || — || October 25, 2008 || Mount Lemmon || Mount Lemmon Survey || — || align=right data-sort-value="0.92" | 920 m || 
|-id=513 bgcolor=#E9E9E9
| 342513 ||  || — || October 25, 2008 || Mount Lemmon || Mount Lemmon Survey || EUN || align=right | 1.4 km || 
|-id=514 bgcolor=#E9E9E9
| 342514 ||  || — || October 27, 2008 || Mount Lemmon || Mount Lemmon Survey || — || align=right data-sort-value="0.98" | 980 m || 
|-id=515 bgcolor=#E9E9E9
| 342515 ||  || — || October 26, 2008 || Socorro || LINEAR || AEO || align=right | 1.3 km || 
|-id=516 bgcolor=#E9E9E9
| 342516 ||  || — || October 27, 2008 || Socorro || LINEAR || — || align=right | 1.8 km || 
|-id=517 bgcolor=#d6d6d6
| 342517 ||  || — || October 31, 2008 || Mount Lemmon || Mount Lemmon Survey || EUP || align=right | 5.9 km || 
|-id=518 bgcolor=#E9E9E9
| 342518 ||  || — || October 31, 2008 || Sandlot || G. Hug || — || align=right | 2.7 km || 
|-id=519 bgcolor=#E9E9E9
| 342519 ||  || — || October 28, 2008 || Socorro || LINEAR || — || align=right | 1.1 km || 
|-id=520 bgcolor=#E9E9E9
| 342520 ||  || — || October 31, 2008 || Socorro || LINEAR || MAR || align=right | 1.5 km || 
|-id=521 bgcolor=#E9E9E9
| 342521 ||  || — || October 28, 2008 || Socorro || LINEAR || — || align=right | 1.2 km || 
|-id=522 bgcolor=#E9E9E9
| 342522 ||  || — || October 28, 2008 || Socorro || LINEAR || — || align=right | 2.7 km || 
|-id=523 bgcolor=#E9E9E9
| 342523 ||  || — || October 26, 2008 || Kitt Peak || Spacewatch || — || align=right | 1.9 km || 
|-id=524 bgcolor=#E9E9E9
| 342524 ||  || — || October 27, 2008 || Socorro || LINEAR || EUN || align=right | 2.0 km || 
|-id=525 bgcolor=#E9E9E9
| 342525 ||  || — || October 27, 2008 || Catalina || CSS || — || align=right | 3.3 km || 
|-id=526 bgcolor=#E9E9E9
| 342526 ||  || — || October 22, 2008 || Kitt Peak || Spacewatch || — || align=right data-sort-value="0.70" | 700 m || 
|-id=527 bgcolor=#E9E9E9
| 342527 ||  || — || October 22, 2008 || Mount Lemmon || Mount Lemmon Survey || — || align=right | 1.8 km || 
|-id=528 bgcolor=#E9E9E9
| 342528 ||  || — || October 23, 2008 || Kitt Peak || Spacewatch || — || align=right | 1.7 km || 
|-id=529 bgcolor=#E9E9E9
| 342529 ||  || — || October 23, 2008 || Kitt Peak || Spacewatch || — || align=right | 1.2 km || 
|-id=530 bgcolor=#E9E9E9
| 342530 ||  || — || October 24, 2008 || Catalina || CSS || ADE || align=right | 3.2 km || 
|-id=531 bgcolor=#E9E9E9
| 342531 ||  || — || October 10, 2008 || Catalina || CSS || ADE || align=right | 2.4 km || 
|-id=532 bgcolor=#E9E9E9
| 342532 ||  || — || October 24, 2008 || Kitt Peak || Spacewatch || — || align=right | 1.2 km || 
|-id=533 bgcolor=#E9E9E9
| 342533 ||  || — || October 25, 2008 || Kitt Peak || Spacewatch || — || align=right | 1.6 km || 
|-id=534 bgcolor=#E9E9E9
| 342534 ||  || — || October 25, 2008 || Kitt Peak || Spacewatch || — || align=right | 1.4 km || 
|-id=535 bgcolor=#E9E9E9
| 342535 ||  || — || October 25, 2008 || Kitt Peak || Spacewatch || — || align=right | 1.5 km || 
|-id=536 bgcolor=#E9E9E9
| 342536 ||  || — || October 25, 2008 || Kitt Peak || Spacewatch || — || align=right | 1.5 km || 
|-id=537 bgcolor=#E9E9E9
| 342537 ||  || — || October 25, 2008 || Kitt Peak || Spacewatch || — || align=right | 1.5 km || 
|-id=538 bgcolor=#E9E9E9
| 342538 ||  || — || October 25, 2008 || Kitt Peak || Spacewatch || — || align=right | 1.8 km || 
|-id=539 bgcolor=#E9E9E9
| 342539 ||  || — || October 25, 2008 || Kitt Peak || Spacewatch || JUN || align=right | 1.2 km || 
|-id=540 bgcolor=#E9E9E9
| 342540 ||  || — || October 25, 2008 || Kitt Peak || Spacewatch || — || align=right | 2.6 km || 
|-id=541 bgcolor=#E9E9E9
| 342541 ||  || — || October 25, 2008 || Kitt Peak || Spacewatch || HOF || align=right | 3.3 km || 
|-id=542 bgcolor=#E9E9E9
| 342542 ||  || — || October 25, 2008 || Catalina || CSS || — || align=right | 2.7 km || 
|-id=543 bgcolor=#E9E9E9
| 342543 ||  || — || October 25, 2008 || Kitt Peak || Spacewatch || — || align=right | 2.9 km || 
|-id=544 bgcolor=#E9E9E9
| 342544 ||  || — || October 25, 2008 || Kitt Peak || Spacewatch || HEN || align=right | 1.2 km || 
|-id=545 bgcolor=#E9E9E9
| 342545 ||  || — || October 25, 2008 || Kitt Peak || Spacewatch || WIT || align=right | 1.1 km || 
|-id=546 bgcolor=#E9E9E9
| 342546 ||  || — || October 4, 1994 || Kitt Peak || Spacewatch || — || align=right | 2.7 km || 
|-id=547 bgcolor=#E9E9E9
| 342547 ||  || — || October 26, 2008 || Kitt Peak || Spacewatch || HNS || align=right | 1.6 km || 
|-id=548 bgcolor=#E9E9E9
| 342548 ||  || — || December 25, 2005 || Mount Lemmon || Mount Lemmon Survey || — || align=right | 1.0 km || 
|-id=549 bgcolor=#E9E9E9
| 342549 ||  || — || October 26, 2008 || Kitt Peak || Spacewatch || — || align=right | 2.1 km || 
|-id=550 bgcolor=#E9E9E9
| 342550 ||  || — || October 26, 2008 || Kitt Peak || Spacewatch || ADE || align=right | 3.0 km || 
|-id=551 bgcolor=#E9E9E9
| 342551 ||  || — || October 26, 2008 || Kitt Peak || Spacewatch || — || align=right | 2.1 km || 
|-id=552 bgcolor=#E9E9E9
| 342552 ||  || — || October 26, 2008 || Kitt Peak || Spacewatch || — || align=right | 1.9 km || 
|-id=553 bgcolor=#E9E9E9
| 342553 ||  || — || October 26, 2008 || Mount Lemmon || Mount Lemmon Survey || BRG || align=right | 1.7 km || 
|-id=554 bgcolor=#E9E9E9
| 342554 ||  || — || October 26, 2008 || Kitt Peak || Spacewatch || GEF || align=right | 1.6 km || 
|-id=555 bgcolor=#E9E9E9
| 342555 ||  || — || October 26, 2008 || Kitt Peak || Spacewatch || — || align=right | 2.8 km || 
|-id=556 bgcolor=#E9E9E9
| 342556 ||  || — || October 26, 2008 || Catalina || CSS || — || align=right | 4.2 km || 
|-id=557 bgcolor=#E9E9E9
| 342557 ||  || — || October 26, 2008 || Kitt Peak || Spacewatch || — || align=right | 1.5 km || 
|-id=558 bgcolor=#E9E9E9
| 342558 ||  || — || October 26, 2008 || Kitt Peak || Spacewatch || — || align=right | 1.0 km || 
|-id=559 bgcolor=#E9E9E9
| 342559 ||  || — || October 26, 2008 || Kitt Peak || Spacewatch || — || align=right | 1.4 km || 
|-id=560 bgcolor=#E9E9E9
| 342560 ||  || — || October 26, 2008 || Kitt Peak || Spacewatch || — || align=right | 1.1 km || 
|-id=561 bgcolor=#E9E9E9
| 342561 ||  || — || October 27, 2008 || Kitt Peak || Spacewatch || — || align=right | 1.3 km || 
|-id=562 bgcolor=#E9E9E9
| 342562 ||  || — || October 27, 2008 || Kitt Peak || Spacewatch || — || align=right | 1.7 km || 
|-id=563 bgcolor=#E9E9E9
| 342563 ||  || — || October 27, 2008 || Kitt Peak || Spacewatch || JUN || align=right | 1.1 km || 
|-id=564 bgcolor=#E9E9E9
| 342564 ||  || — || October 27, 2008 || Kitt Peak || Spacewatch || — || align=right | 2.0 km || 
|-id=565 bgcolor=#E9E9E9
| 342565 ||  || — || October 27, 2008 || Kitt Peak || Spacewatch || — || align=right | 1.0 km || 
|-id=566 bgcolor=#E9E9E9
| 342566 ||  || — || October 27, 2008 || Kitt Peak || Spacewatch || — || align=right | 1.1 km || 
|-id=567 bgcolor=#E9E9E9
| 342567 ||  || — || October 27, 2008 || Kitt Peak || Spacewatch || — || align=right | 1.8 km || 
|-id=568 bgcolor=#E9E9E9
| 342568 ||  || — || October 27, 2008 || Kitt Peak || Spacewatch || MIS || align=right | 3.6 km || 
|-id=569 bgcolor=#E9E9E9
| 342569 ||  || — || October 27, 2008 || Kitt Peak || Spacewatch || — || align=right | 1.8 km || 
|-id=570 bgcolor=#E9E9E9
| 342570 ||  || — || October 27, 2008 || Kitt Peak || Spacewatch || — || align=right | 3.5 km || 
|-id=571 bgcolor=#E9E9E9
| 342571 ||  || — || October 27, 2008 || Kitt Peak || Spacewatch || — || align=right | 1.4 km || 
|-id=572 bgcolor=#E9E9E9
| 342572 ||  || — || October 27, 2008 || Kitt Peak || Spacewatch || — || align=right | 2.7 km || 
|-id=573 bgcolor=#E9E9E9
| 342573 ||  || — || October 27, 2008 || Mount Lemmon || Mount Lemmon Survey || — || align=right | 1.7 km || 
|-id=574 bgcolor=#E9E9E9
| 342574 ||  || — || October 27, 2008 || Kitt Peak || Spacewatch || — || align=right | 1.9 km || 
|-id=575 bgcolor=#fefefe
| 342575 ||  || — || October 28, 2008 || Mount Lemmon || Mount Lemmon Survey || — || align=right | 1.3 km || 
|-id=576 bgcolor=#E9E9E9
| 342576 ||  || — || October 28, 2008 || Kitt Peak || Spacewatch || — || align=right | 1.9 km || 
|-id=577 bgcolor=#E9E9E9
| 342577 ||  || — || October 28, 2008 || Kitt Peak || Spacewatch || — || align=right | 1.7 km || 
|-id=578 bgcolor=#E9E9E9
| 342578 ||  || — || October 28, 2008 || Kitt Peak || Spacewatch || — || align=right | 1.1 km || 
|-id=579 bgcolor=#E9E9E9
| 342579 ||  || — || October 28, 2008 || Kitt Peak || Spacewatch || — || align=right | 1.6 km || 
|-id=580 bgcolor=#E9E9E9
| 342580 ||  || — || October 28, 2008 || Kitt Peak || Spacewatch || — || align=right data-sort-value="0.91" | 910 m || 
|-id=581 bgcolor=#E9E9E9
| 342581 ||  || — || October 28, 2008 || Kitt Peak || Spacewatch || HNS || align=right | 1.1 km || 
|-id=582 bgcolor=#E9E9E9
| 342582 ||  || — || October 28, 2008 || Catalina || CSS || EUN || align=right | 1.3 km || 
|-id=583 bgcolor=#E9E9E9
| 342583 ||  || — || October 28, 2008 || Mount Lemmon || Mount Lemmon Survey || — || align=right | 2.2 km || 
|-id=584 bgcolor=#E9E9E9
| 342584 ||  || — || October 28, 2008 || Mount Lemmon || Mount Lemmon Survey || — || align=right | 1.2 km || 
|-id=585 bgcolor=#E9E9E9
| 342585 ||  || — || October 28, 2008 || Mount Lemmon || Mount Lemmon Survey || — || align=right | 1.5 km || 
|-id=586 bgcolor=#E9E9E9
| 342586 ||  || — || October 28, 2008 || Mount Lemmon || Mount Lemmon Survey || KON || align=right | 2.3 km || 
|-id=587 bgcolor=#E9E9E9
| 342587 ||  || — || September 24, 2008 || Mount Lemmon || Mount Lemmon Survey || — || align=right | 1.4 km || 
|-id=588 bgcolor=#E9E9E9
| 342588 ||  || — || October 28, 2008 || Mount Lemmon || Mount Lemmon Survey || — || align=right data-sort-value="0.82" | 820 m || 
|-id=589 bgcolor=#E9E9E9
| 342589 ||  || — || October 28, 2008 || Kitt Peak || Spacewatch || — || align=right | 2.3 km || 
|-id=590 bgcolor=#E9E9E9
| 342590 ||  || — || October 29, 2008 || Kitt Peak || Spacewatch || — || align=right | 2.2 km || 
|-id=591 bgcolor=#E9E9E9
| 342591 ||  || — || October 29, 2008 || Kitt Peak || Spacewatch || — || align=right | 2.4 km || 
|-id=592 bgcolor=#E9E9E9
| 342592 ||  || — || October 29, 2008 || Catalina || CSS || RAF || align=right | 1.4 km || 
|-id=593 bgcolor=#E9E9E9
| 342593 ||  || — || October 29, 2008 || Kitt Peak || Spacewatch || — || align=right | 1.2 km || 
|-id=594 bgcolor=#E9E9E9
| 342594 ||  || — || October 29, 2008 || Kitt Peak || Spacewatch || — || align=right | 1.5 km || 
|-id=595 bgcolor=#E9E9E9
| 342595 ||  || — || October 29, 2008 || Kitt Peak || Spacewatch || — || align=right | 1.2 km || 
|-id=596 bgcolor=#E9E9E9
| 342596 ||  || — || October 29, 2008 || Kitt Peak || Spacewatch || critical || align=right data-sort-value="0.78" | 780 m || 
|-id=597 bgcolor=#E9E9E9
| 342597 ||  || — || October 29, 2008 || Kitt Peak || Spacewatch || — || align=right | 1.5 km || 
|-id=598 bgcolor=#E9E9E9
| 342598 ||  || — || October 30, 2008 || Kitt Peak || Spacewatch || — || align=right | 1.6 km || 
|-id=599 bgcolor=#E9E9E9
| 342599 ||  || — || October 30, 2008 || Kitt Peak || Spacewatch || — || align=right | 1.3 km || 
|-id=600 bgcolor=#E9E9E9
| 342600 ||  || — || October 30, 2008 || Catalina || CSS || HNS || align=right | 1.5 km || 
|}

342601–342700 

|-bgcolor=#E9E9E9
| 342601 ||  || — || October 30, 2008 || Mount Lemmon || Mount Lemmon Survey || — || align=right | 2.1 km || 
|-id=602 bgcolor=#E9E9E9
| 342602 ||  || — || October 30, 2008 || Kitt Peak || Spacewatch || — || align=right | 1.7 km || 
|-id=603 bgcolor=#E9E9E9
| 342603 ||  || — || October 30, 2008 || Kitt Peak || Spacewatch || — || align=right | 2.5 km || 
|-id=604 bgcolor=#E9E9E9
| 342604 ||  || — || October 31, 2008 || Mount Lemmon || Mount Lemmon Survey || — || align=right | 2.1 km || 
|-id=605 bgcolor=#E9E9E9
| 342605 ||  || — || October 31, 2008 || Mount Lemmon || Mount Lemmon Survey || RAF || align=right data-sort-value="0.96" | 960 m || 
|-id=606 bgcolor=#E9E9E9
| 342606 ||  || — || October 31, 2008 || Mount Lemmon || Mount Lemmon Survey || PAD || align=right | 1.5 km || 
|-id=607 bgcolor=#E9E9E9
| 342607 ||  || — || October 31, 2008 || Mount Lemmon || Mount Lemmon Survey || — || align=right | 1.1 km || 
|-id=608 bgcolor=#E9E9E9
| 342608 ||  || — || October 31, 2008 || Catalina || CSS || — || align=right | 2.6 km || 
|-id=609 bgcolor=#E9E9E9
| 342609 ||  || — || October 31, 2008 || Kitt Peak || Spacewatch || — || align=right | 1.6 km || 
|-id=610 bgcolor=#E9E9E9
| 342610 ||  || — || December 15, 2004 || Socorro || LINEAR || — || align=right | 2.9 km || 
|-id=611 bgcolor=#E9E9E9
| 342611 ||  || — || October 25, 2008 || Siding Spring || SSS || — || align=right | 2.2 km || 
|-id=612 bgcolor=#E9E9E9
| 342612 ||  || — || October 30, 2008 || Catalina || CSS || HNS || align=right | 1.8 km || 
|-id=613 bgcolor=#E9E9E9
| 342613 ||  || — || October 31, 2008 || Catalina || CSS || — || align=right | 2.0 km || 
|-id=614 bgcolor=#E9E9E9
| 342614 ||  || — || October 22, 2008 || Kitt Peak || Spacewatch || — || align=right | 2.2 km || 
|-id=615 bgcolor=#d6d6d6
| 342615 ||  || — || October 23, 2008 || Kitt Peak || Spacewatch || THM || align=right | 2.6 km || 
|-id=616 bgcolor=#E9E9E9
| 342616 ||  || — || October 21, 2008 || Kitt Peak || Spacewatch || — || align=right | 2.0 km || 
|-id=617 bgcolor=#E9E9E9
| 342617 ||  || — || October 23, 2008 || Kitt Peak || Spacewatch || — || align=right | 2.5 km || 
|-id=618 bgcolor=#E9E9E9
| 342618 ||  || — || October 23, 2008 || Kitt Peak || Spacewatch || — || align=right | 1.5 km || 
|-id=619 bgcolor=#E9E9E9
| 342619 ||  || — || October 24, 2008 || Catalina || CSS || — || align=right | 1.6 km || 
|-id=620 bgcolor=#d6d6d6
| 342620 Beita ||  ||  || October 25, 2008 || La Cañada || J. Lacruz || — || align=right | 3.0 km || 
|-id=621 bgcolor=#E9E9E9
| 342621 ||  || — || October 26, 2008 || Kitt Peak || Spacewatch || — || align=right | 1.1 km || 
|-id=622 bgcolor=#E9E9E9
| 342622 ||  || — || October 27, 2008 || Kitt Peak || Spacewatch || — || align=right | 1.8 km || 
|-id=623 bgcolor=#E9E9E9
| 342623 ||  || — || October 28, 2008 || Kitt Peak || Spacewatch || WIT || align=right | 1.2 km || 
|-id=624 bgcolor=#E9E9E9
| 342624 ||  || — || October 28, 2008 || Mount Lemmon || Mount Lemmon Survey || — || align=right data-sort-value="0.95" | 950 m || 
|-id=625 bgcolor=#E9E9E9
| 342625 ||  || — || October 28, 2008 || Mount Lemmon || Mount Lemmon Survey || — || align=right | 1.9 km || 
|-id=626 bgcolor=#E9E9E9
| 342626 ||  || — || October 24, 2008 || Catalina || CSS || — || align=right | 3.1 km || 
|-id=627 bgcolor=#E9E9E9
| 342627 ||  || — || October 22, 2008 || Kitt Peak || Spacewatch || JUN || align=right | 1.2 km || 
|-id=628 bgcolor=#E9E9E9
| 342628 ||  || — || October 30, 2008 || Kitt Peak || Spacewatch || — || align=right | 2.1 km || 
|-id=629 bgcolor=#E9E9E9
| 342629 ||  || — || October 31, 2008 || Mount Lemmon || Mount Lemmon Survey || GEF || align=right | 1.3 km || 
|-id=630 bgcolor=#d6d6d6
| 342630 ||  || — || October 30, 2008 || Mount Lemmon || Mount Lemmon Survey || EOS || align=right | 2.6 km || 
|-id=631 bgcolor=#d6d6d6
| 342631 ||  || — || October 31, 2008 || Mount Lemmon || Mount Lemmon Survey || — || align=right | 3.8 km || 
|-id=632 bgcolor=#E9E9E9
| 342632 ||  || — || October 28, 2008 || Mount Lemmon || Mount Lemmon Survey || — || align=right data-sort-value="0.89" | 890 m || 
|-id=633 bgcolor=#E9E9E9
| 342633 ||  || — || October 30, 2008 || Catalina || CSS || — || align=right | 2.1 km || 
|-id=634 bgcolor=#E9E9E9
| 342634 ||  || — || October 27, 2008 || Mount Lemmon || Mount Lemmon Survey || — || align=right | 1.8 km || 
|-id=635 bgcolor=#E9E9E9
| 342635 ||  || — || October 20, 2008 || Kitt Peak || Spacewatch || — || align=right | 1.9 km || 
|-id=636 bgcolor=#E9E9E9
| 342636 ||  || — || October 20, 2008 || Kitt Peak || Spacewatch || WIT || align=right data-sort-value="0.88" | 880 m || 
|-id=637 bgcolor=#E9E9E9
| 342637 ||  || — || October 27, 2008 || Mount Lemmon || Mount Lemmon Survey || — || align=right | 1.8 km || 
|-id=638 bgcolor=#E9E9E9
| 342638 ||  || — || October 27, 2008 || Kitt Peak || Spacewatch || MIT || align=right | 3.0 km || 
|-id=639 bgcolor=#E9E9E9
| 342639 ||  || — || October 23, 2008 || Kitt Peak || Spacewatch || — || align=right | 1.9 km || 
|-id=640 bgcolor=#E9E9E9
| 342640 ||  || — || October 20, 2008 || Mount Lemmon || Mount Lemmon Survey || — || align=right | 2.8 km || 
|-id=641 bgcolor=#E9E9E9
| 342641 ||  || — || October 23, 2008 || Kitt Peak || Spacewatch || JUN || align=right data-sort-value="0.97" | 970 m || 
|-id=642 bgcolor=#E9E9E9
| 342642 ||  || — || October 25, 2008 || Kitt Peak || Spacewatch || — || align=right | 1.3 km || 
|-id=643 bgcolor=#d6d6d6
| 342643 ||  || — || October 21, 2008 || Kitt Peak || Spacewatch || — || align=right | 2.9 km || 
|-id=644 bgcolor=#E9E9E9
| 342644 ||  || — || October 26, 2008 || Catalina || CSS || — || align=right | 2.6 km || 
|-id=645 bgcolor=#E9E9E9
| 342645 ||  || — || October 29, 2008 || Catalina || CSS || GEF || align=right | 1.7 km || 
|-id=646 bgcolor=#E9E9E9
| 342646 ||  || — || October 24, 2008 || Socorro || LINEAR || — || align=right | 1.7 km || 
|-id=647 bgcolor=#E9E9E9
| 342647 ||  || — || October 24, 2008 || Catalina || CSS || — || align=right | 2.8 km || 
|-id=648 bgcolor=#E9E9E9
| 342648 ||  || — || October 29, 2008 || Socorro || LINEAR || ADE || align=right | 3.0 km || 
|-id=649 bgcolor=#E9E9E9
| 342649 ||  || — || October 29, 2008 || Kitt Peak || Spacewatch || — || align=right | 2.5 km || 
|-id=650 bgcolor=#E9E9E9
| 342650 ||  || — || November 2, 2008 || Socorro || LINEAR || — || align=right | 1.9 km || 
|-id=651 bgcolor=#E9E9E9
| 342651 ||  || — || November 2, 2008 || Socorro || LINEAR || — || align=right | 1.3 km || 
|-id=652 bgcolor=#E9E9E9
| 342652 ||  || — || November 2, 2008 || Socorro || LINEAR || — || align=right | 2.2 km || 
|-id=653 bgcolor=#E9E9E9
| 342653 ||  || — || October 6, 2008 || La Sagra || OAM Obs. || MAR || align=right | 1.8 km || 
|-id=654 bgcolor=#E9E9E9
| 342654 ||  || — || September 29, 2008 || Mount Lemmon || Mount Lemmon Survey || — || align=right | 1.5 km || 
|-id=655 bgcolor=#E9E9E9
| 342655 ||  || — || November 3, 2008 || Socorro || LINEAR || BRU || align=right | 2.5 km || 
|-id=656 bgcolor=#E9E9E9
| 342656 ||  || — || November 4, 2008 || Jarnac || Jarnac Obs. || — || align=right | 2.8 km || 
|-id=657 bgcolor=#E9E9E9
| 342657 ||  || — || November 4, 2008 || Vail-Jarnac || Jarnac Obs. || — || align=right | 1.6 km || 
|-id=658 bgcolor=#E9E9E9
| 342658 ||  || — || November 4, 2008 || Bisei SG Center || BATTeRS || — || align=right | 2.8 km || 
|-id=659 bgcolor=#E9E9E9
| 342659 ||  || — || November 4, 2008 || Vail-Jarnac || Jarnac Obs. || — || align=right | 2.1 km || 
|-id=660 bgcolor=#E9E9E9
| 342660 ||  || — || November 6, 2008 || Nazaret || G. Muler || ADE || align=right | 3.7 km || 
|-id=661 bgcolor=#E9E9E9
| 342661 ||  || — || November 1, 2008 || Kitt Peak || Spacewatch || — || align=right | 2.2 km || 
|-id=662 bgcolor=#E9E9E9
| 342662 ||  || — || November 2, 2008 || Mount Lemmon || Mount Lemmon Survey || JUN || align=right | 1.1 km || 
|-id=663 bgcolor=#E9E9E9
| 342663 ||  || — || November 2, 2008 || Mount Lemmon || Mount Lemmon Survey || — || align=right | 2.7 km || 
|-id=664 bgcolor=#E9E9E9
| 342664 ||  || — || November 3, 2008 || Mount Lemmon || Mount Lemmon Survey || MAR || align=right | 1.6 km || 
|-id=665 bgcolor=#E9E9E9
| 342665 ||  || — || November 3, 2008 || Kitt Peak || Spacewatch || — || align=right | 1.1 km || 
|-id=666 bgcolor=#E9E9E9
| 342666 ||  || — || November 6, 2008 || Andrushivka || Andrushivka Obs. || — || align=right | 1.8 km || 
|-id=667 bgcolor=#E9E9E9
| 342667 ||  || — || December 2, 2004 || Catalina || CSS || — || align=right | 1.4 km || 
|-id=668 bgcolor=#E9E9E9
| 342668 ||  || — || November 7, 2008 || Mount Lemmon || Mount Lemmon Survey || — || align=right | 1.3 km || 
|-id=669 bgcolor=#E9E9E9
| 342669 ||  || — || November 1, 2008 || Kitt Peak || Spacewatch || HEN || align=right | 1.1 km || 
|-id=670 bgcolor=#E9E9E9
| 342670 ||  || — || November 1, 2008 || Kitt Peak || Spacewatch || — || align=right | 1.3 km || 
|-id=671 bgcolor=#E9E9E9
| 342671 ||  || — || October 20, 2008 || Kitt Peak || Spacewatch || — || align=right | 1.4 km || 
|-id=672 bgcolor=#E9E9E9
| 342672 ||  || — || November 2, 2008 || Kitt Peak || Spacewatch || — || align=right | 1.6 km || 
|-id=673 bgcolor=#E9E9E9
| 342673 ||  || — || May 12, 2007 || Kitt Peak || Spacewatch || — || align=right | 1.5 km || 
|-id=674 bgcolor=#E9E9E9
| 342674 ||  || — || November 2, 2008 || Mount Lemmon || Mount Lemmon Survey || HNS || align=right | 1.4 km || 
|-id=675 bgcolor=#d6d6d6
| 342675 ||  || — || November 2, 2008 || Kitt Peak || Spacewatch || CHA || align=right | 2.7 km || 
|-id=676 bgcolor=#E9E9E9
| 342676 ||  || — || April 9, 2006 || Kitt Peak || Spacewatch || KON || align=right | 3.2 km || 
|-id=677 bgcolor=#E9E9E9
| 342677 ||  || — || November 2, 2008 || Mount Lemmon || Mount Lemmon Survey || ADE || align=right | 4.3 km || 
|-id=678 bgcolor=#E9E9E9
| 342678 ||  || — || November 2, 2008 || Kitt Peak || Spacewatch || — || align=right | 1.1 km || 
|-id=679 bgcolor=#E9E9E9
| 342679 ||  || — || November 2, 2008 || Kitt Peak || Spacewatch || WIT || align=right | 1.1 km || 
|-id=680 bgcolor=#E9E9E9
| 342680 ||  || — || November 3, 2008 || Catalina || CSS || — || align=right | 1.5 km || 
|-id=681 bgcolor=#E9E9E9
| 342681 ||  || — || November 3, 2008 || Kitt Peak || Spacewatch || — || align=right | 1.3 km || 
|-id=682 bgcolor=#E9E9E9
| 342682 ||  || — || November 4, 2008 || Catalina || CSS || — || align=right | 1.4 km || 
|-id=683 bgcolor=#fefefe
| 342683 ||  || — || November 6, 2008 || Mount Lemmon || Mount Lemmon Survey || — || align=right | 1.2 km || 
|-id=684 bgcolor=#E9E9E9
| 342684 ||  || — || November 6, 2008 || Mount Lemmon || Mount Lemmon Survey || — || align=right | 1.4 km || 
|-id=685 bgcolor=#E9E9E9
| 342685 ||  || — || November 6, 2008 || Catalina || CSS || — || align=right | 2.0 km || 
|-id=686 bgcolor=#E9E9E9
| 342686 ||  || — || November 6, 2008 || Catalina || CSS || — || align=right | 2.5 km || 
|-id=687 bgcolor=#E9E9E9
| 342687 ||  || — || September 22, 2008 || Mount Lemmon || Mount Lemmon Survey || — || align=right | 2.2 km || 
|-id=688 bgcolor=#E9E9E9
| 342688 ||  || — || November 8, 2008 || Mount Lemmon || Mount Lemmon Survey || NEM || align=right | 2.6 km || 
|-id=689 bgcolor=#E9E9E9
| 342689 ||  || — || October 2, 2008 || Mount Lemmon || Mount Lemmon Survey || GEF || align=right | 1.2 km || 
|-id=690 bgcolor=#E9E9E9
| 342690 ||  || — || November 10, 2008 || La Sagra || OAM Obs. || EUN || align=right | 1.8 km || 
|-id=691 bgcolor=#E9E9E9
| 342691 ||  || — || November 10, 2008 || La Sagra || OAM Obs. || — || align=right | 1.9 km || 
|-id=692 bgcolor=#E9E9E9
| 342692 ||  || — || November 3, 2008 || Kitt Peak || Spacewatch || WIT || align=right data-sort-value="0.86" | 860 m || 
|-id=693 bgcolor=#E9E9E9
| 342693 ||  || — || November 9, 2008 || Kitt Peak || Spacewatch || AST || align=right | 1.9 km || 
|-id=694 bgcolor=#d6d6d6
| 342694 ||  || — || November 8, 2008 || Kitt Peak || Spacewatch || KOR || align=right | 1.5 km || 
|-id=695 bgcolor=#E9E9E9
| 342695 ||  || — || November 9, 2008 || Kitt Peak || Spacewatch || — || align=right | 2.5 km || 
|-id=696 bgcolor=#E9E9E9
| 342696 ||  || — || November 2, 2008 || Mount Lemmon || Mount Lemmon Survey || — || align=right | 2.0 km || 
|-id=697 bgcolor=#E9E9E9
| 342697 ||  || — || November 6, 2008 || Kitt Peak || Spacewatch || — || align=right | 3.8 km || 
|-id=698 bgcolor=#E9E9E9
| 342698 ||  || — || November 3, 2008 || Catalina || CSS || — || align=right | 3.4 km || 
|-id=699 bgcolor=#E9E9E9
| 342699 ||  || — || November 7, 2008 || Mount Lemmon || Mount Lemmon Survey || — || align=right | 1.7 km || 
|-id=700 bgcolor=#E9E9E9
| 342700 ||  || — || November 3, 2008 || Kitt Peak || Spacewatch || MRX || align=right | 1.2 km || 
|}

342701–342800 

|-bgcolor=#E9E9E9
| 342701 ||  || — || November 3, 2008 || Catalina || CSS || MAR || align=right | 1.6 km || 
|-id=702 bgcolor=#E9E9E9
| 342702 ||  || — || November 6, 2008 || Mount Lemmon || Mount Lemmon Survey || INO || align=right | 2.2 km || 
|-id=703 bgcolor=#E9E9E9
| 342703 ||  || — || November 7, 2008 || Mount Lemmon || Mount Lemmon Survey || — || align=right | 2.0 km || 
|-id=704 bgcolor=#E9E9E9
| 342704 ||  || — || November 2, 2008 || Mount Lemmon || Mount Lemmon Survey || — || align=right | 1.9 km || 
|-id=705 bgcolor=#E9E9E9
| 342705 ||  || — || September 18, 2003 || Palomar || NEAT || — || align=right | 2.6 km || 
|-id=706 bgcolor=#d6d6d6
| 342706 ||  || — || November 6, 2008 || Kitt Peak || Spacewatch || — || align=right | 4.0 km || 
|-id=707 bgcolor=#E9E9E9
| 342707 ||  || — || November 1, 2008 || Mount Lemmon || Mount Lemmon Survey || — || align=right | 2.4 km || 
|-id=708 bgcolor=#E9E9E9
| 342708 ||  || — || November 17, 2008 || Catalina || CSS || — || align=right | 2.7 km || 
|-id=709 bgcolor=#E9E9E9
| 342709 ||  || — || November 18, 2008 || Socorro || LINEAR || — || align=right | 1.6 km || 
|-id=710 bgcolor=#E9E9E9
| 342710 ||  || — || November 18, 2008 || Bisei SG Center || BATTeRS || — || align=right | 2.0 km || 
|-id=711 bgcolor=#E9E9E9
| 342711 ||  || — || November 17, 2008 || Kitt Peak || Spacewatch || — || align=right | 1.3 km || 
|-id=712 bgcolor=#E9E9E9
| 342712 ||  || — || November 17, 2008 || Kitt Peak || Spacewatch || — || align=right | 1.9 km || 
|-id=713 bgcolor=#E9E9E9
| 342713 ||  || — || November 18, 2008 || Kitt Peak || Spacewatch || — || align=right | 1.4 km || 
|-id=714 bgcolor=#E9E9E9
| 342714 ||  || — || November 18, 2008 || Socorro || LINEAR || — || align=right | 1.9 km || 
|-id=715 bgcolor=#E9E9E9
| 342715 ||  || — || October 27, 2008 || Kitt Peak || Spacewatch || HNS || align=right | 1.5 km || 
|-id=716 bgcolor=#E9E9E9
| 342716 ||  || — || November 17, 2008 || Kitt Peak || Spacewatch || — || align=right data-sort-value="0.85" | 850 m || 
|-id=717 bgcolor=#E9E9E9
| 342717 ||  || — || November 17, 2008 || Kitt Peak || Spacewatch || — || align=right data-sort-value="0.78" | 780 m || 
|-id=718 bgcolor=#fefefe
| 342718 ||  || — || November 17, 2008 || Kitt Peak || Spacewatch || — || align=right | 1.1 km || 
|-id=719 bgcolor=#E9E9E9
| 342719 ||  || — || November 17, 2008 || Kitt Peak || Spacewatch || — || align=right | 2.3 km || 
|-id=720 bgcolor=#E9E9E9
| 342720 ||  || — || November 17, 2008 || Kitt Peak || Spacewatch || — || align=right | 1.3 km || 
|-id=721 bgcolor=#E9E9E9
| 342721 ||  || — || November 18, 2008 || Catalina || CSS || — || align=right | 2.8 km || 
|-id=722 bgcolor=#E9E9E9
| 342722 ||  || — || November 18, 2008 || Catalina || CSS || — || align=right | 1.8 km || 
|-id=723 bgcolor=#E9E9E9
| 342723 ||  || — || November 18, 2008 || Catalina || CSS || — || align=right | 1.00 km || 
|-id=724 bgcolor=#fefefe
| 342724 ||  || — || November 18, 2008 || Catalina || CSS || — || align=right data-sort-value="0.98" | 980 m || 
|-id=725 bgcolor=#E9E9E9
| 342725 ||  || — || November 18, 2008 || Kitt Peak || Spacewatch || — || align=right | 2.7 km || 
|-id=726 bgcolor=#E9E9E9
| 342726 ||  || — || October 23, 2008 || Kitt Peak || Spacewatch || — || align=right | 1.3 km || 
|-id=727 bgcolor=#E9E9E9
| 342727 ||  || — || November 20, 2008 || Mayhill || A. Lowe || — || align=right | 1.3 km || 
|-id=728 bgcolor=#E9E9E9
| 342728 ||  || — || November 17, 2008 || Kitt Peak || Spacewatch || AEO || align=right | 1.1 km || 
|-id=729 bgcolor=#E9E9E9
| 342729 ||  || — || November 17, 2008 || Kitt Peak || Spacewatch || HEN || align=right data-sort-value="0.96" | 960 m || 
|-id=730 bgcolor=#E9E9E9
| 342730 ||  || — || October 28, 2008 || Kitt Peak || Spacewatch || NEM || align=right | 1.9 km || 
|-id=731 bgcolor=#E9E9E9
| 342731 ||  || — || November 17, 2008 || Kitt Peak || Spacewatch || HOF || align=right | 2.7 km || 
|-id=732 bgcolor=#E9E9E9
| 342732 ||  || — || November 17, 2008 || Kitt Peak || Spacewatch || — || align=right | 2.5 km || 
|-id=733 bgcolor=#E9E9E9
| 342733 ||  || — || November 17, 2008 || Kitt Peak || Spacewatch || — || align=right | 1.3 km || 
|-id=734 bgcolor=#E9E9E9
| 342734 ||  || — || November 17, 2008 || Kitt Peak || Spacewatch || — || align=right | 1.2 km || 
|-id=735 bgcolor=#E9E9E9
| 342735 ||  || — || November 17, 2008 || Kitt Peak || Spacewatch || — || align=right | 1.8 km || 
|-id=736 bgcolor=#E9E9E9
| 342736 ||  || — || November 17, 2008 || Kitt Peak || Spacewatch || — || align=right | 1.9 km || 
|-id=737 bgcolor=#E9E9E9
| 342737 ||  || — || November 18, 2008 || Catalina || CSS || — || align=right | 1.3 km || 
|-id=738 bgcolor=#E9E9E9
| 342738 ||  || — || November 18, 2008 || Catalina || CSS || — || align=right | 1.1 km || 
|-id=739 bgcolor=#E9E9E9
| 342739 ||  || — || March 25, 2006 || Kitt Peak || Spacewatch || — || align=right | 2.0 km || 
|-id=740 bgcolor=#E9E9E9
| 342740 ||  || — || November 18, 2008 || Kitt Peak || Spacewatch || — || align=right | 1.3 km || 
|-id=741 bgcolor=#E9E9E9
| 342741 ||  || — || November 19, 2008 || Kitt Peak || Spacewatch || — || align=right | 1.5 km || 
|-id=742 bgcolor=#E9E9E9
| 342742 ||  || — || November 19, 2008 || Mount Lemmon || Mount Lemmon Survey || — || align=right | 2.7 km || 
|-id=743 bgcolor=#E9E9E9
| 342743 ||  || — || November 19, 2008 || Socorro || LINEAR || — || align=right | 1.1 km || 
|-id=744 bgcolor=#E9E9E9
| 342744 ||  || — || November 23, 2008 || Socorro || LINEAR || — || align=right | 2.7 km || 
|-id=745 bgcolor=#E9E9E9
| 342745 ||  || — || November 22, 2008 || La Sagra || OAM Obs. || — || align=right | 1.0 km || 
|-id=746 bgcolor=#E9E9E9
| 342746 ||  || — || November 21, 2008 || Bisei SG Center || BATTeRS || — || align=right | 1.6 km || 
|-id=747 bgcolor=#E9E9E9
| 342747 ||  || — || November 20, 2008 || Socorro || LINEAR || EUN || align=right | 2.0 km || 
|-id=748 bgcolor=#E9E9E9
| 342748 ||  || — || September 25, 2008 || Mount Lemmon || Mount Lemmon Survey || — || align=right | 1.7 km || 
|-id=749 bgcolor=#E9E9E9
| 342749 ||  || — || November 18, 2008 || Kitt Peak || Spacewatch || — || align=right | 2.0 km || 
|-id=750 bgcolor=#E9E9E9
| 342750 ||  || — || November 18, 2008 || Kitt Peak || Spacewatch || — || align=right | 1.7 km || 
|-id=751 bgcolor=#E9E9E9
| 342751 ||  || — || December 10, 2004 || Kitt Peak || Spacewatch || — || align=right data-sort-value="0.99" | 990 m || 
|-id=752 bgcolor=#E9E9E9
| 342752 ||  || — || November 18, 2008 || Kitt Peak || Spacewatch || — || align=right | 1.1 km || 
|-id=753 bgcolor=#E9E9E9
| 342753 ||  || — || November 19, 2008 || Mount Lemmon || Mount Lemmon Survey || — || align=right | 4.2 km || 
|-id=754 bgcolor=#E9E9E9
| 342754 ||  || — || September 23, 2008 || Mount Lemmon || Mount Lemmon Survey || — || align=right | 2.6 km || 
|-id=755 bgcolor=#E9E9E9
| 342755 ||  || — || November 20, 2008 || Kitt Peak || Spacewatch || MRX || align=right data-sort-value="0.89" | 890 m || 
|-id=756 bgcolor=#E9E9E9
| 342756 ||  || — || November 20, 2008 || Kitt Peak || Spacewatch || — || align=right | 2.0 km || 
|-id=757 bgcolor=#E9E9E9
| 342757 ||  || — || November 20, 2008 || Kitt Peak || Spacewatch || — || align=right | 1.9 km || 
|-id=758 bgcolor=#E9E9E9
| 342758 ||  || — || November 20, 2008 || Kitt Peak || Spacewatch || — || align=right | 1.3 km || 
|-id=759 bgcolor=#E9E9E9
| 342759 ||  || — || November 20, 2008 || Kitt Peak || Spacewatch || — || align=right | 2.2 km || 
|-id=760 bgcolor=#E9E9E9
| 342760 ||  || — || November 21, 2008 || Mount Lemmon || Mount Lemmon Survey || — || align=right | 2.4 km || 
|-id=761 bgcolor=#E9E9E9
| 342761 ||  || — || November 24, 2008 || Dauban || F. Kugel || HEN || align=right | 1.2 km || 
|-id=762 bgcolor=#E9E9E9
| 342762 ||  || — || November 26, 2008 || Farra d'Isonzo || Farra d'Isonzo || — || align=right | 2.5 km || 
|-id=763 bgcolor=#E9E9E9
| 342763 ||  || — || November 21, 2008 || Cerro Burek || Alianza S4 Obs. || — || align=right | 2.0 km || 
|-id=764 bgcolor=#E9E9E9
| 342764 Alantitus ||  ||  || October 26, 2008 || Mount Lemmon || Mount Lemmon Survey || — || align=right | 1.6 km || 
|-id=765 bgcolor=#fefefe
| 342765 ||  || — || November 28, 2008 || Piszkéstető || K. Sárneczky, C. Orgel || — || align=right | 1.0 km || 
|-id=766 bgcolor=#E9E9E9
| 342766 ||  || — || November 17, 2008 || Catalina || CSS || — || align=right | 3.2 km || 
|-id=767 bgcolor=#E9E9E9
| 342767 ||  || — || November 19, 2008 || Catalina || CSS || — || align=right | 1.1 km || 
|-id=768 bgcolor=#E9E9E9
| 342768 ||  || — || November 24, 2008 || Mount Lemmon || Mount Lemmon Survey || RAF || align=right | 1.6 km || 
|-id=769 bgcolor=#E9E9E9
| 342769 ||  || — || November 23, 2008 || La Sagra || OAM Obs. || — || align=right | 2.1 km || 
|-id=770 bgcolor=#E9E9E9
| 342770 ||  || — || November 23, 2008 || La Sagra || OAM Obs. || — || align=right | 2.3 km || 
|-id=771 bgcolor=#E9E9E9
| 342771 ||  || — || November 26, 2008 || La Sagra || OAM Obs. || — || align=right | 2.8 km || 
|-id=772 bgcolor=#E9E9E9
| 342772 ||  || — || November 27, 2008 || Antares || ARO || — || align=right | 2.6 km || 
|-id=773 bgcolor=#E9E9E9
| 342773 ||  || — || November 27, 2008 || Črni Vrh || Črni Vrh || — || align=right | 1.9 km || 
|-id=774 bgcolor=#E9E9E9
| 342774 ||  || — || November 30, 2008 || Socorro || LINEAR || — || align=right | 1.2 km || 
|-id=775 bgcolor=#E9E9E9
| 342775 ||  || — || November 19, 2008 || Catalina || CSS || — || align=right | 1.8 km || 
|-id=776 bgcolor=#E9E9E9
| 342776 ||  || — || November 30, 2008 || Kitt Peak || Spacewatch || — || align=right | 1.4 km || 
|-id=777 bgcolor=#E9E9E9
| 342777 ||  || — || November 30, 2008 || Kitt Peak || Spacewatch || — || align=right | 2.1 km || 
|-id=778 bgcolor=#E9E9E9
| 342778 ||  || — || October 21, 2008 || Mount Lemmon || Mount Lemmon Survey || — || align=right | 2.9 km || 
|-id=779 bgcolor=#E9E9E9
| 342779 ||  || — || November 30, 2008 || Catalina || CSS || — || align=right | 1.4 km || 
|-id=780 bgcolor=#E9E9E9
| 342780 ||  || — || November 30, 2008 || Kitt Peak || Spacewatch || HOF || align=right | 2.3 km || 
|-id=781 bgcolor=#E9E9E9
| 342781 ||  || — || November 30, 2008 || Kitt Peak || Spacewatch || — || align=right | 1.2 km || 
|-id=782 bgcolor=#E9E9E9
| 342782 ||  || — || October 22, 2008 || Kitt Peak || Spacewatch || — || align=right | 1.8 km || 
|-id=783 bgcolor=#E9E9E9
| 342783 ||  || — || November 30, 2008 || Kitt Peak || Spacewatch || — || align=right | 1.3 km || 
|-id=784 bgcolor=#d6d6d6
| 342784 ||  || — || November 30, 2008 || Kitt Peak || Spacewatch || — || align=right | 2.9 km || 
|-id=785 bgcolor=#E9E9E9
| 342785 ||  || — || November 30, 2008 || Kitt Peak || Spacewatch || — || align=right | 1.4 km || 
|-id=786 bgcolor=#E9E9E9
| 342786 ||  || — || October 30, 2008 || Kitt Peak || Spacewatch || — || align=right | 1.8 km || 
|-id=787 bgcolor=#E9E9E9
| 342787 ||  || — || September 29, 2003 || Anderson Mesa || LONEOS || — || align=right | 3.2 km || 
|-id=788 bgcolor=#E9E9E9
| 342788 ||  || — || November 30, 2008 || Kitt Peak || Spacewatch || — || align=right | 2.6 km || 
|-id=789 bgcolor=#E9E9E9
| 342789 ||  || — || November 30, 2008 || Catalina || CSS || BRG || align=right | 2.1 km || 
|-id=790 bgcolor=#E9E9E9
| 342790 ||  || — || November 30, 2008 || Kitt Peak || Spacewatch || JUN || align=right | 1.5 km || 
|-id=791 bgcolor=#E9E9E9
| 342791 ||  || — || November 24, 2008 || Kitt Peak || Spacewatch || — || align=right | 3.5 km || 
|-id=792 bgcolor=#d6d6d6
| 342792 ||  || — || November 24, 2008 || Mount Lemmon || Mount Lemmon Survey || — || align=right | 2.8 km || 
|-id=793 bgcolor=#E9E9E9
| 342793 ||  || — || November 17, 2008 || Kitt Peak || Spacewatch || WIT || align=right | 1.1 km || 
|-id=794 bgcolor=#E9E9E9
| 342794 ||  || — || November 19, 2008 || Mount Lemmon || Mount Lemmon Survey || EUN || align=right | 1.6 km || 
|-id=795 bgcolor=#E9E9E9
| 342795 ||  || — || November 21, 2008 || Mount Lemmon || Mount Lemmon Survey || — || align=right | 3.0 km || 
|-id=796 bgcolor=#E9E9E9
| 342796 ||  || — || November 18, 2008 || Kitt Peak || Spacewatch || — || align=right | 1.7 km || 
|-id=797 bgcolor=#E9E9E9
| 342797 ||  || — || November 19, 2008 || Kitt Peak || Spacewatch || — || align=right | 1.5 km || 
|-id=798 bgcolor=#E9E9E9
| 342798 ||  || — || November 19, 2008 || Kitt Peak || Spacewatch || — || align=right | 3.1 km || 
|-id=799 bgcolor=#E9E9E9
| 342799 ||  || — || November 21, 2008 || Kitt Peak || Spacewatch || — || align=right | 1.8 km || 
|-id=800 bgcolor=#d6d6d6
| 342800 ||  || — || November 22, 2008 || Kitt Peak || Spacewatch || — || align=right | 4.0 km || 
|}

342801–342900 

|-bgcolor=#E9E9E9
| 342801 ||  || — || November 30, 2008 || Socorro || LINEAR || — || align=right | 2.7 km || 
|-id=802 bgcolor=#d6d6d6
| 342802 ||  || — || November 23, 2008 || Mount Lemmon || Mount Lemmon Survey || — || align=right | 4.2 km || 
|-id=803 bgcolor=#E9E9E9
| 342803 ||  || — || November 17, 2008 || Catalina || CSS || MAR || align=right | 1.7 km || 
|-id=804 bgcolor=#E9E9E9
| 342804 ||  || — || March 9, 2002 || Kitt Peak || Spacewatch || — || align=right | 1.4 km || 
|-id=805 bgcolor=#E9E9E9
| 342805 ||  || — || December 12, 2004 || Catalina || CSS || INO || align=right | 1.7 km || 
|-id=806 bgcolor=#E9E9E9
| 342806 ||  || — || October 26, 2003 || Kitt Peak || Spacewatch || — || align=right | 2.1 km || 
|-id=807 bgcolor=#E9E9E9
| 342807 ||  || — || December 2, 2008 || Bisei SG Center || BATTeRS || — || align=right | 3.5 km || 
|-id=808 bgcolor=#E9E9E9
| 342808 ||  || — || December 4, 2008 || Mayhill || A. Lowe || — || align=right | 3.1 km || 
|-id=809 bgcolor=#E9E9E9
| 342809 ||  || — || December 4, 2008 || Vail-Jarnac || Jarnac Obs. || — || align=right | 2.8 km || 
|-id=810 bgcolor=#E9E9E9
| 342810 ||  || — || December 2, 2008 || Socorro || LINEAR || — || align=right | 1.6 km || 
|-id=811 bgcolor=#E9E9E9
| 342811 ||  || — || December 2, 2008 || Socorro || LINEAR || — || align=right | 2.9 km || 
|-id=812 bgcolor=#E9E9E9
| 342812 ||  || — || December 15, 2004 || Socorro || LINEAR || — || align=right | 1.4 km || 
|-id=813 bgcolor=#E9E9E9
| 342813 ||  || — || December 4, 2008 || Socorro || LINEAR || — || align=right | 3.6 km || 
|-id=814 bgcolor=#E9E9E9
| 342814 ||  || — || December 4, 2008 || Socorro || LINEAR || — || align=right | 3.0 km || 
|-id=815 bgcolor=#E9E9E9
| 342815 ||  || — || December 3, 2008 || Marly || P. Kocher || — || align=right | 1.4 km || 
|-id=816 bgcolor=#E9E9E9
| 342816 ||  || — || December 6, 2008 || Bisei SG Center || BATTeRS || — || align=right | 1.5 km || 
|-id=817 bgcolor=#E9E9E9
| 342817 ||  || — || December 1, 2008 || Mount Lemmon || Mount Lemmon Survey || — || align=right | 1.5 km || 
|-id=818 bgcolor=#E9E9E9
| 342818 ||  || — || December 1, 2008 || Kitt Peak || Spacewatch || — || align=right | 1.6 km || 
|-id=819 bgcolor=#E9E9E9
| 342819 ||  || — || December 1, 2008 || Kitt Peak || Spacewatch || — || align=right | 1.5 km || 
|-id=820 bgcolor=#E9E9E9
| 342820 ||  || — || December 1, 2008 || Kitt Peak || Spacewatch || — || align=right | 2.1 km || 
|-id=821 bgcolor=#d6d6d6
| 342821 ||  || — || December 1, 2008 || Mount Lemmon || Mount Lemmon Survey || BRA || align=right | 1.8 km || 
|-id=822 bgcolor=#E9E9E9
| 342822 ||  || — || December 1, 2008 || Kitt Peak || Spacewatch || — || align=right | 4.0 km || 
|-id=823 bgcolor=#E9E9E9
| 342823 ||  || — || December 1, 2008 || Kitt Peak || Spacewatch || — || align=right | 1.2 km || 
|-id=824 bgcolor=#E9E9E9
| 342824 ||  || — || December 1, 2008 || Mount Lemmon || Mount Lemmon Survey || — || align=right | 3.2 km || 
|-id=825 bgcolor=#E9E9E9
| 342825 ||  || — || December 2, 2008 || Kitt Peak || Spacewatch || — || align=right | 1.8 km || 
|-id=826 bgcolor=#E9E9E9
| 342826 ||  || — || April 11, 2002 || Kitt Peak || M. W. Buie || DOR || align=right | 2.7 km || 
|-id=827 bgcolor=#E9E9E9
| 342827 ||  || — || December 2, 2008 || Kitt Peak || Spacewatch || NEM || align=right | 2.4 km || 
|-id=828 bgcolor=#E9E9E9
| 342828 ||  || — || November 6, 2008 || Kitt Peak || Spacewatch || — || align=right | 1.5 km || 
|-id=829 bgcolor=#E9E9E9
| 342829 ||  || — || December 2, 2008 || Kitt Peak || Spacewatch || — || align=right | 2.3 km || 
|-id=830 bgcolor=#E9E9E9
| 342830 ||  || — || December 2, 2008 || Kitt Peak || Spacewatch || HEN || align=right | 1.0 km || 
|-id=831 bgcolor=#E9E9E9
| 342831 ||  || — || December 2, 2008 || Kitt Peak || Spacewatch || — || align=right | 1.7 km || 
|-id=832 bgcolor=#E9E9E9
| 342832 ||  || — || December 2, 2008 || Kitt Peak || Spacewatch || — || align=right | 2.0 km || 
|-id=833 bgcolor=#E9E9E9
| 342833 ||  || — || December 2, 2008 || Kitt Peak || Spacewatch || — || align=right | 3.5 km || 
|-id=834 bgcolor=#d6d6d6
| 342834 ||  || — || December 2, 2008 || Kitt Peak || Spacewatch || EOS || align=right | 2.8 km || 
|-id=835 bgcolor=#d6d6d6
| 342835 ||  || — || December 6, 2008 || Kitt Peak || Spacewatch || — || align=right | 4.1 km || 
|-id=836 bgcolor=#E9E9E9
| 342836 ||  || — || December 2, 2008 || Kitt Peak || Spacewatch || — || align=right | 1.5 km || 
|-id=837 bgcolor=#E9E9E9
| 342837 ||  || — || December 4, 2008 || Kitt Peak || Spacewatch || HEN || align=right | 1.1 km || 
|-id=838 bgcolor=#E9E9E9
| 342838 ||  || — || December 7, 2008 || Mount Lemmon || Mount Lemmon Survey || — || align=right | 2.4 km || 
|-id=839 bgcolor=#E9E9E9
| 342839 ||  || — || December 7, 2008 || Socorro || LINEAR || EUN || align=right | 1.7 km || 
|-id=840 bgcolor=#E9E9E9
| 342840 ||  || — || December 1, 2008 || Mount Lemmon || Mount Lemmon Survey || — || align=right | 1.4 km || 
|-id=841 bgcolor=#E9E9E9
| 342841 ||  || — || December 17, 2008 || Hibiscus || N. Teamo || — || align=right | 1.6 km || 
|-id=842 bgcolor=#C7FF8F
| 342842 ||  || — || December 18, 2008 || Siding Spring || SSS || centaurdamocloid || align=right | 67 km || 
|-id=843 bgcolor=#E9E9E9
| 342843 Davidbowie ||  ||  || December 21, 2008 || Calar Alto || F. Hormuth || HEN || align=right | 1.1 km || 
|-id=844 bgcolor=#E9E9E9
| 342844 ||  || — || December 22, 2008 || Calar Alto || F. Hormuth || WIT || align=right | 1.1 km || 
|-id=845 bgcolor=#d6d6d6
| 342845 ||  || — || December 22, 2008 || Dauban || F. Kugel || BRA || align=right | 2.3 km || 
|-id=846 bgcolor=#E9E9E9
| 342846 ||  || — || December 20, 2008 || Catalina || CSS || DOR || align=right | 3.8 km || 
|-id=847 bgcolor=#d6d6d6
| 342847 ||  || — || December 22, 2008 || Mayhill || A. Lowe || — || align=right | 4.1 km || 
|-id=848 bgcolor=#d6d6d6
| 342848 ||  || — || December 22, 2008 || Marly || P. Kocher || — || align=right | 3.4 km || 
|-id=849 bgcolor=#E9E9E9
| 342849 ||  || — || December 20, 2008 || Mount Lemmon || Mount Lemmon Survey || — || align=right | 2.2 km || 
|-id=850 bgcolor=#E9E9E9
| 342850 ||  || — || December 20, 2008 || Mount Lemmon || Mount Lemmon Survey || — || align=right | 2.2 km || 
|-id=851 bgcolor=#E9E9E9
| 342851 ||  || — || December 21, 2008 || Mount Lemmon || Mount Lemmon Survey || — || align=right | 1.6 km || 
|-id=852 bgcolor=#E9E9E9
| 342852 ||  || — || December 21, 2008 || Mount Lemmon || Mount Lemmon Survey || MIS || align=right | 2.6 km || 
|-id=853 bgcolor=#E9E9E9
| 342853 ||  || — || December 20, 2008 || Mount Lemmon || Mount Lemmon Survey || — || align=right | 2.1 km || 
|-id=854 bgcolor=#E9E9E9
| 342854 ||  || — || December 20, 2008 || Lulin Observatory || LUSS || — || align=right | 2.1 km || 
|-id=855 bgcolor=#E9E9E9
| 342855 ||  || — || December 21, 2008 || Kitt Peak || Spacewatch || — || align=right | 2.3 km || 
|-id=856 bgcolor=#d6d6d6
| 342856 ||  || — || December 21, 2008 || Kitt Peak || Spacewatch || KOR || align=right | 1.5 km || 
|-id=857 bgcolor=#E9E9E9
| 342857 ||  || — || December 21, 2008 || Mount Lemmon || Mount Lemmon Survey || WAT || align=right | 1.6 km || 
|-id=858 bgcolor=#d6d6d6
| 342858 ||  || — || December 21, 2008 || Kitt Peak || Spacewatch || — || align=right | 2.0 km || 
|-id=859 bgcolor=#E9E9E9
| 342859 ||  || — || December 19, 2008 || La Sagra || OAM Obs. || — || align=right | 2.3 km || 
|-id=860 bgcolor=#E9E9E9
| 342860 ||  || — || December 20, 2008 || La Sagra || OAM Obs. || GER || align=right | 1.8 km || 
|-id=861 bgcolor=#E9E9E9
| 342861 ||  || — || December 22, 2008 || La Sagra || OAM Obs. || — || align=right | 3.3 km || 
|-id=862 bgcolor=#E9E9E9
| 342862 ||  || — || December 22, 2008 || Socorro || LINEAR || — || align=right | 1.5 km || 
|-id=863 bgcolor=#d6d6d6
| 342863 ||  || — || December 30, 2008 || Piszkéstető || K. Sárneczky || EOS || align=right | 2.2 km || 
|-id=864 bgcolor=#d6d6d6
| 342864 Teresamateo ||  ||  || December 31, 2008 || Nazaret || G. Muler, J. M. Ruiz || — || align=right | 4.1 km || 
|-id=865 bgcolor=#E9E9E9
| 342865 ||  || — || December 20, 2008 || Socorro || LINEAR || MIS || align=right | 3.5 km || 
|-id=866 bgcolor=#FFC2E0
| 342866 ||  || — || December 31, 2008 || Mount Lemmon || Mount Lemmon Survey || APOPHAcritical || align=right data-sort-value="0.34" | 340 m || 
|-id=867 bgcolor=#d6d6d6
| 342867 ||  || — || December 31, 2008 || Bergisch Gladbac || W. Bickel || EOS || align=right | 3.0 km || 
|-id=868 bgcolor=#d6d6d6
| 342868 ||  || — || December 22, 2008 || Kitt Peak || Spacewatch || — || align=right | 3.0 km || 
|-id=869 bgcolor=#E9E9E9
| 342869 ||  || — || December 29, 2008 || Kitt Peak || Spacewatch || — || align=right | 2.9 km || 
|-id=870 bgcolor=#E9E9E9
| 342870 ||  || — || December 29, 2008 || Kitt Peak || Spacewatch || INO || align=right | 1.4 km || 
|-id=871 bgcolor=#E9E9E9
| 342871 ||  || — || December 29, 2008 || Mount Lemmon || Mount Lemmon Survey || — || align=right | 3.3 km || 
|-id=872 bgcolor=#d6d6d6
| 342872 ||  || — || December 29, 2008 || Mount Lemmon || Mount Lemmon Survey || URS || align=right | 4.4 km || 
|-id=873 bgcolor=#E9E9E9
| 342873 ||  || — || December 29, 2008 || Mount Lemmon || Mount Lemmon Survey || — || align=right | 1.9 km || 
|-id=874 bgcolor=#E9E9E9
| 342874 ||  || — || December 29, 2008 || Kitt Peak || Spacewatch || EUN || align=right | 1.6 km || 
|-id=875 bgcolor=#d6d6d6
| 342875 ||  || — || October 15, 2007 || Kitt Peak || Spacewatch || — || align=right | 2.6 km || 
|-id=876 bgcolor=#d6d6d6
| 342876 ||  || — || November 3, 2007 || Mount Lemmon || Mount Lemmon Survey || EOS || align=right | 2.0 km || 
|-id=877 bgcolor=#E9E9E9
| 342877 ||  || — || December 29, 2008 || Mount Lemmon || Mount Lemmon Survey || — || align=right | 2.1 km || 
|-id=878 bgcolor=#d6d6d6
| 342878 ||  || — || December 29, 2008 || Mount Lemmon || Mount Lemmon Survey || — || align=right | 2.7 km || 
|-id=879 bgcolor=#d6d6d6
| 342879 ||  || — || December 29, 2008 || Mount Lemmon || Mount Lemmon Survey || — || align=right | 3.9 km || 
|-id=880 bgcolor=#E9E9E9
| 342880 ||  || — || December 30, 2008 || Kitt Peak || Spacewatch || — || align=right | 2.0 km || 
|-id=881 bgcolor=#E9E9E9
| 342881 ||  || — || December 30, 2008 || Kitt Peak || Spacewatch || HEN || align=right data-sort-value="0.94" | 940 m || 
|-id=882 bgcolor=#d6d6d6
| 342882 ||  || — || December 30, 2008 || Kitt Peak || Spacewatch || — || align=right | 3.4 km || 
|-id=883 bgcolor=#E9E9E9
| 342883 ||  || — || December 30, 2008 || Mount Lemmon || Mount Lemmon Survey || — || align=right | 2.3 km || 
|-id=884 bgcolor=#d6d6d6
| 342884 ||  || — || December 29, 2008 || Mount Lemmon || Mount Lemmon Survey || — || align=right | 3.3 km || 
|-id=885 bgcolor=#d6d6d6
| 342885 ||  || — || December 30, 2008 || Kitt Peak || Spacewatch || — || align=right | 2.8 km || 
|-id=886 bgcolor=#d6d6d6
| 342886 ||  || — || December 31, 2008 || Kitt Peak || Spacewatch || KOR || align=right | 1.4 km || 
|-id=887 bgcolor=#d6d6d6
| 342887 ||  || — || December 31, 2008 || Kitt Peak || Spacewatch || — || align=right | 4.2 km || 
|-id=888 bgcolor=#E9E9E9
| 342888 ||  || — || December 29, 2008 || Kitt Peak || Spacewatch || AGN || align=right | 1.2 km || 
|-id=889 bgcolor=#E9E9E9
| 342889 ||  || — || December 29, 2008 || Kitt Peak || Spacewatch || — || align=right | 2.3 km || 
|-id=890 bgcolor=#d6d6d6
| 342890 ||  || — || December 29, 2008 || Kitt Peak || Spacewatch || — || align=right | 3.1 km || 
|-id=891 bgcolor=#d6d6d6
| 342891 ||  || — || December 29, 2008 || Kitt Peak || Spacewatch || — || align=right | 3.5 km || 
|-id=892 bgcolor=#d6d6d6
| 342892 ||  || — || December 29, 2008 || Kitt Peak || Spacewatch || CHA || align=right | 2.0 km || 
|-id=893 bgcolor=#d6d6d6
| 342893 ||  || — || December 29, 2008 || Kitt Peak || Spacewatch || — || align=right | 2.8 km || 
|-id=894 bgcolor=#d6d6d6
| 342894 ||  || — || December 29, 2008 || Kitt Peak || Spacewatch || KOR || align=right | 2.0 km || 
|-id=895 bgcolor=#d6d6d6
| 342895 ||  || — || December 29, 2008 || Kitt Peak || Spacewatch || — || align=right | 3.7 km || 
|-id=896 bgcolor=#E9E9E9
| 342896 ||  || — || December 29, 2008 || Kitt Peak || Spacewatch || — || align=right | 2.0 km || 
|-id=897 bgcolor=#d6d6d6
| 342897 ||  || — || December 29, 2008 || Kitt Peak || Spacewatch || — || align=right | 3.2 km || 
|-id=898 bgcolor=#E9E9E9
| 342898 ||  || — || December 31, 2008 || Kitt Peak || Spacewatch || AGN || align=right | 1.5 km || 
|-id=899 bgcolor=#d6d6d6
| 342899 ||  || — || December 29, 2008 || Kitt Peak || Spacewatch || KOR || align=right | 2.1 km || 
|-id=900 bgcolor=#d6d6d6
| 342900 ||  || — || December 29, 2008 || Mount Lemmon || Mount Lemmon Survey || EOS || align=right | 2.4 km || 
|}

342901–343000 

|-bgcolor=#d6d6d6
| 342901 ||  || — || December 30, 2008 || Kitt Peak || Spacewatch || — || align=right | 3.7 km || 
|-id=902 bgcolor=#fefefe
| 342902 ||  || — || December 30, 2008 || Kitt Peak || Spacewatch || — || align=right | 1.6 km || 
|-id=903 bgcolor=#d6d6d6
| 342903 ||  || — || December 30, 2008 || Kitt Peak || Spacewatch || BRA || align=right | 2.4 km || 
|-id=904 bgcolor=#d6d6d6
| 342904 ||  || — || December 30, 2008 || Kitt Peak || Spacewatch || — || align=right | 3.0 km || 
|-id=905 bgcolor=#d6d6d6
| 342905 ||  || — || December 30, 2008 || Kitt Peak || Spacewatch || — || align=right | 3.4 km || 
|-id=906 bgcolor=#d6d6d6
| 342906 ||  || — || December 30, 2008 || Kitt Peak || Spacewatch || KOR || align=right | 1.6 km || 
|-id=907 bgcolor=#d6d6d6
| 342907 ||  || — || December 21, 2008 || Kitt Peak || Spacewatch || — || align=right | 2.7 km || 
|-id=908 bgcolor=#E9E9E9
| 342908 ||  || — || December 29, 2008 || Catalina || CSS || — || align=right | 2.2 km || 
|-id=909 bgcolor=#E9E9E9
| 342909 ||  || — || December 30, 2008 || Kitt Peak || Spacewatch || AST || align=right | 1.7 km || 
|-id=910 bgcolor=#E9E9E9
| 342910 ||  || — || December 30, 2008 || Kitt Peak || Spacewatch || — || align=right | 2.8 km || 
|-id=911 bgcolor=#d6d6d6
| 342911 ||  || — || December 21, 2008 || Kitt Peak || Spacewatch || KOR || align=right | 1.7 km || 
|-id=912 bgcolor=#d6d6d6
| 342912 ||  || — || December 22, 2008 || Mount Lemmon || Mount Lemmon Survey || EOS || align=right | 2.7 km || 
|-id=913 bgcolor=#d6d6d6
| 342913 ||  || — || December 21, 2008 || Kitt Peak || Spacewatch || — || align=right | 2.6 km || 
|-id=914 bgcolor=#E9E9E9
| 342914 ||  || — || December 21, 2008 || Catalina || CSS || — || align=right | 3.7 km || 
|-id=915 bgcolor=#d6d6d6
| 342915 ||  || — || December 21, 2008 || Kitt Peak || Spacewatch || — || align=right | 3.1 km || 
|-id=916 bgcolor=#d6d6d6
| 342916 ||  || — || December 22, 2008 || Kitt Peak || Spacewatch || — || align=right | 2.5 km || 
|-id=917 bgcolor=#d6d6d6
| 342917 ||  || — || December 25, 2008 || Lulin || LUSS || — || align=right | 5.5 km || 
|-id=918 bgcolor=#d6d6d6
| 342918 ||  || — || December 30, 2008 || Mount Lemmon || Mount Lemmon Survey || CHA || align=right | 1.9 km || 
|-id=919 bgcolor=#E9E9E9
| 342919 ||  || — || December 21, 2008 || Catalina || CSS || — || align=right | 3.5 km || 
|-id=920 bgcolor=#d6d6d6
| 342920 ||  || — || December 30, 2008 || Mount Lemmon || Mount Lemmon Survey || — || align=right | 4.3 km || 
|-id=921 bgcolor=#d6d6d6
| 342921 ||  || — || December 29, 2008 || Mount Lemmon || Mount Lemmon Survey || URS || align=right | 5.0 km || 
|-id=922 bgcolor=#E9E9E9
| 342922 ||  || — || April 1, 2001 || Anderson Mesa || LONEOS || EUN || align=right | 2.1 km || 
|-id=923 bgcolor=#d6d6d6
| 342923 ||  || — || December 31, 2008 || Catalina || CSS || — || align=right | 4.0 km || 
|-id=924 bgcolor=#d6d6d6
| 342924 ||  || — || November 1, 2008 || Mount Lemmon || Mount Lemmon Survey || — || align=right | 3.5 km || 
|-id=925 bgcolor=#d6d6d6
| 342925 ||  || — || December 30, 2008 || Mount Lemmon || Mount Lemmon Survey || — || align=right | 2.9 km || 
|-id=926 bgcolor=#E9E9E9
| 342926 ||  || — || December 21, 2008 || Catalina || CSS || GEF || align=right | 1.6 km || 
|-id=927 bgcolor=#d6d6d6
| 342927 ||  || — || December 31, 2008 || Kitt Peak || Spacewatch || — || align=right | 3.4 km || 
|-id=928 bgcolor=#E9E9E9
| 342928 ||  || — || December 29, 2008 || Catalina || CSS || — || align=right | 3.1 km || 
|-id=929 bgcolor=#d6d6d6
| 342929 ||  || — || December 22, 2008 || Kitt Peak || Spacewatch || KOR || align=right | 1.3 km || 
|-id=930 bgcolor=#E9E9E9
| 342930 ||  || — || January 3, 2009 || Wildberg || R. Apitzsch || — || align=right | 1.7 km || 
|-id=931 bgcolor=#d6d6d6
| 342931 ||  || — || January 2, 2009 || Mount Lemmon || Mount Lemmon Survey || — || align=right | 3.3 km || 
|-id=932 bgcolor=#d6d6d6
| 342932 ||  || — || January 2, 2009 || Kitt Peak || Spacewatch || — || align=right | 3.4 km || 
|-id=933 bgcolor=#E9E9E9
| 342933 ||  || — || January 3, 2009 || Kitt Peak || Spacewatch || WIT || align=right | 1.1 km || 
|-id=934 bgcolor=#E9E9E9
| 342934 ||  || — || January 3, 2009 || Kitt Peak || Spacewatch || MRX || align=right | 1.0 km || 
|-id=935 bgcolor=#d6d6d6
| 342935 ||  || — || January 3, 2009 || Kitt Peak || Spacewatch || — || align=right | 2.4 km || 
|-id=936 bgcolor=#E9E9E9
| 342936 ||  || — || January 3, 2009 || Kitt Peak || Spacewatch || — || align=right | 1.7 km || 
|-id=937 bgcolor=#d6d6d6
| 342937 ||  || — || January 3, 2009 || Kitt Peak || Spacewatch || — || align=right | 3.3 km || 
|-id=938 bgcolor=#d6d6d6
| 342938 ||  || — || January 3, 2009 || Kitt Peak || Spacewatch || TEL || align=right | 1.7 km || 
|-id=939 bgcolor=#E9E9E9
| 342939 ||  || — || January 3, 2009 || Kitt Peak || Spacewatch || — || align=right | 2.3 km || 
|-id=940 bgcolor=#E9E9E9
| 342940 ||  || — || January 3, 2009 || Kitt Peak || Spacewatch || CLO || align=right | 2.7 km || 
|-id=941 bgcolor=#d6d6d6
| 342941 ||  || — || January 15, 2009 || Kitt Peak || Spacewatch || KOR || align=right | 1.4 km || 
|-id=942 bgcolor=#E9E9E9
| 342942 ||  || — || January 15, 2009 || Kitt Peak || Spacewatch || KAZ || align=right | 1.7 km || 
|-id=943 bgcolor=#d6d6d6
| 342943 ||  || — || January 15, 2009 || Kitt Peak || Spacewatch || EOS || align=right | 2.2 km || 
|-id=944 bgcolor=#d6d6d6
| 342944 ||  || — || January 15, 2009 || Kitt Peak || Spacewatch || — || align=right | 2.4 km || 
|-id=945 bgcolor=#d6d6d6
| 342945 ||  || — || January 15, 2009 || Kitt Peak || Spacewatch || — || align=right | 2.3 km || 
|-id=946 bgcolor=#E9E9E9
| 342946 ||  || — || January 15, 2009 || Kitt Peak || Spacewatch || WIT || align=right | 1.5 km || 
|-id=947 bgcolor=#d6d6d6
| 342947 ||  || — || January 15, 2009 || Kitt Peak || Spacewatch || — || align=right | 4.2 km || 
|-id=948 bgcolor=#d6d6d6
| 342948 ||  || — || January 15, 2009 || Kitt Peak || Spacewatch || — || align=right | 1.9 km || 
|-id=949 bgcolor=#d6d6d6
| 342949 ||  || — || January 15, 2009 || Kitt Peak || Spacewatch || HYG || align=right | 2.9 km || 
|-id=950 bgcolor=#E9E9E9
| 342950 ||  || — || January 15, 2009 || Kitt Peak || Spacewatch || AGN || align=right | 1.3 km || 
|-id=951 bgcolor=#d6d6d6
| 342951 ||  || — || January 3, 2009 || Mount Lemmon || Mount Lemmon Survey || — || align=right | 2.5 km || 
|-id=952 bgcolor=#d6d6d6
| 342952 ||  || — || January 15, 2009 || Kitt Peak || Spacewatch || — || align=right | 3.2 km || 
|-id=953 bgcolor=#d6d6d6
| 342953 ||  || — || January 1, 2009 || Kitt Peak || Spacewatch || — || align=right | 3.6 km || 
|-id=954 bgcolor=#d6d6d6
| 342954 ||  || — || January 3, 2009 || Mount Lemmon || Mount Lemmon Survey || EOS || align=right | 2.6 km || 
|-id=955 bgcolor=#d6d6d6
| 342955 ||  || — || January 1, 2009 || Kitt Peak || Spacewatch || EMA || align=right | 3.8 km || 
|-id=956 bgcolor=#d6d6d6
| 342956 ||  || — || January 15, 2009 || Kitt Peak || Spacewatch || EOS || align=right | 2.7 km || 
|-id=957 bgcolor=#E9E9E9
| 342957 ||  || — || January 17, 2009 || Catalina || CSS || BAR || align=right | 2.2 km || 
|-id=958 bgcolor=#d6d6d6
| 342958 ||  || — || January 16, 2009 || Dauban || F. Kugel || — || align=right | 4.8 km || 
|-id=959 bgcolor=#d6d6d6
| 342959 ||  || — || January 16, 2009 || Dauban || F. Kugel || — || align=right | 3.4 km || 
|-id=960 bgcolor=#d6d6d6
| 342960 ||  || — || January 16, 2009 || Calar Alto || F. Hormuth || CHA || align=right | 2.2 km || 
|-id=961 bgcolor=#E9E9E9
| 342961 ||  || — || January 16, 2009 || Dauban || F. Kugel || AGN || align=right | 1.3 km || 
|-id=962 bgcolor=#d6d6d6
| 342962 ||  || — || January 18, 2009 || Socorro || LINEAR || — || align=right | 3.3 km || 
|-id=963 bgcolor=#d6d6d6
| 342963 ||  || — || January 18, 2009 || Socorro || LINEAR || MEL || align=right | 4.0 km || 
|-id=964 bgcolor=#d6d6d6
| 342964 ||  || — || January 18, 2009 || Socorro || LINEAR || — || align=right | 3.4 km || 
|-id=965 bgcolor=#d6d6d6
| 342965 ||  || — || January 17, 2009 || Socorro || LINEAR || AEG || align=right | 4.1 km || 
|-id=966 bgcolor=#d6d6d6
| 342966 ||  || — || January 18, 2009 || Sandlot || G. Hug || EOS || align=right | 2.1 km || 
|-id=967 bgcolor=#d6d6d6
| 342967 ||  || — || January 25, 2009 || Mayhill || A. Lowe || LAU || align=right | 1.2 km || 
|-id=968 bgcolor=#d6d6d6
| 342968 ||  || — || January 25, 2009 || Hibiscus || N. Teamo || — || align=right | 2.3 km || 
|-id=969 bgcolor=#E9E9E9
| 342969 ||  || — || January 16, 2009 || Mount Lemmon || Mount Lemmon Survey || NEM || align=right | 2.7 km || 
|-id=970 bgcolor=#d6d6d6
| 342970 ||  || — || January 16, 2009 || Kitt Peak || Spacewatch || EOS || align=right | 2.3 km || 
|-id=971 bgcolor=#d6d6d6
| 342971 ||  || — || January 17, 2009 || Sierra Stars || W. G. Dillon || KOR || align=right | 1.3 km || 
|-id=972 bgcolor=#d6d6d6
| 342972 ||  || — || January 17, 2009 || Kitt Peak || Spacewatch || — || align=right | 3.6 km || 
|-id=973 bgcolor=#d6d6d6
| 342973 ||  || — || January 17, 2009 || Kitt Peak || Spacewatch || — || align=right | 3.0 km || 
|-id=974 bgcolor=#d6d6d6
| 342974 ||  || — || January 16, 2009 || Kitt Peak || Spacewatch || — || align=right | 2.9 km || 
|-id=975 bgcolor=#E9E9E9
| 342975 ||  || — || January 16, 2009 || Kitt Peak || Spacewatch || — || align=right | 2.0 km || 
|-id=976 bgcolor=#d6d6d6
| 342976 ||  || — || January 16, 2009 || Kitt Peak || Spacewatch || — || align=right | 4.9 km || 
|-id=977 bgcolor=#d6d6d6
| 342977 ||  || — || January 16, 2009 || Kitt Peak || Spacewatch || EOS || align=right | 2.5 km || 
|-id=978 bgcolor=#d6d6d6
| 342978 ||  || — || January 16, 2009 || Kitt Peak || Spacewatch || — || align=right | 3.1 km || 
|-id=979 bgcolor=#d6d6d6
| 342979 ||  || — || January 16, 2009 || Kitt Peak || Spacewatch || KOR || align=right | 1.5 km || 
|-id=980 bgcolor=#d6d6d6
| 342980 ||  || — || January 16, 2009 || Kitt Peak || Spacewatch || — || align=right | 3.7 km || 
|-id=981 bgcolor=#d6d6d6
| 342981 ||  || — || January 16, 2009 || Kitt Peak || Spacewatch || — || align=right | 2.4 km || 
|-id=982 bgcolor=#d6d6d6
| 342982 ||  || — || January 16, 2009 || Kitt Peak || Spacewatch || — || align=right | 4.1 km || 
|-id=983 bgcolor=#d6d6d6
| 342983 ||  || — || January 16, 2009 || Kitt Peak || Spacewatch || — || align=right | 3.6 km || 
|-id=984 bgcolor=#d6d6d6
| 342984 ||  || — || January 16, 2009 || Kitt Peak || Spacewatch || — || align=right | 2.9 km || 
|-id=985 bgcolor=#d6d6d6
| 342985 ||  || — || January 16, 2009 || Mount Lemmon || Mount Lemmon Survey || — || align=right | 4.0 km || 
|-id=986 bgcolor=#E9E9E9
| 342986 ||  || — || January 16, 2009 || Mount Lemmon || Mount Lemmon Survey || — || align=right | 2.3 km || 
|-id=987 bgcolor=#E9E9E9
| 342987 ||  || — || January 16, 2009 || Mount Lemmon || Mount Lemmon Survey || MRX || align=right | 1.5 km || 
|-id=988 bgcolor=#d6d6d6
| 342988 ||  || — || January 16, 2009 || Mount Lemmon || Mount Lemmon Survey || — || align=right | 5.4 km || 
|-id=989 bgcolor=#d6d6d6
| 342989 ||  || — || January 16, 2009 || Kitt Peak || Spacewatch || URS || align=right | 6.0 km || 
|-id=990 bgcolor=#d6d6d6
| 342990 ||  || — || January 16, 2009 || Mount Lemmon || Mount Lemmon Survey || KOR || align=right | 1.5 km || 
|-id=991 bgcolor=#d6d6d6
| 342991 ||  || — || January 16, 2009 || Mount Lemmon || Mount Lemmon Survey || — || align=right | 3.4 km || 
|-id=992 bgcolor=#d6d6d6
| 342992 ||  || — || January 20, 2009 || Kitt Peak || Spacewatch || — || align=right | 2.5 km || 
|-id=993 bgcolor=#E9E9E9
| 342993 ||  || — || January 17, 2009 || La Sagra || OAM Obs. || — || align=right | 2.6 km || 
|-id=994 bgcolor=#d6d6d6
| 342994 ||  || — || January 18, 2009 || Mount Lemmon || Mount Lemmon Survey || EOS || align=right | 2.0 km || 
|-id=995 bgcolor=#d6d6d6
| 342995 ||  || — || January 20, 2009 || Kitt Peak || Spacewatch || EOS || align=right | 2.1 km || 
|-id=996 bgcolor=#E9E9E9
| 342996 ||  || — || January 23, 2009 || Purple Mountain || PMO NEO || — || align=right | 2.3 km || 
|-id=997 bgcolor=#d6d6d6
| 342997 ||  || — || January 25, 2009 || Kitt Peak || Spacewatch || — || align=right | 2.3 km || 
|-id=998 bgcolor=#d6d6d6
| 342998 ||  || — || January 26, 2009 || Purple Mountain || PMO NEO || — || align=right | 3.5 km || 
|-id=999 bgcolor=#d6d6d6
| 342999 ||  || — || January 28, 2009 || Dauban || F. Kugel || HYG || align=right | 2.4 km || 
|-id=000 bgcolor=#d6d6d6
| 343000 Ijontichy ||  ||  || January 29, 2009 || Taunus || E. Schwab, U. Zimmer || — || align=right | 3.8 km || 
|}

References

External links 
 Discovery Circumstances: Numbered Minor Planets (340001)–(345000) (IAU Minor Planet Center)

0342